= History of the nude in art =

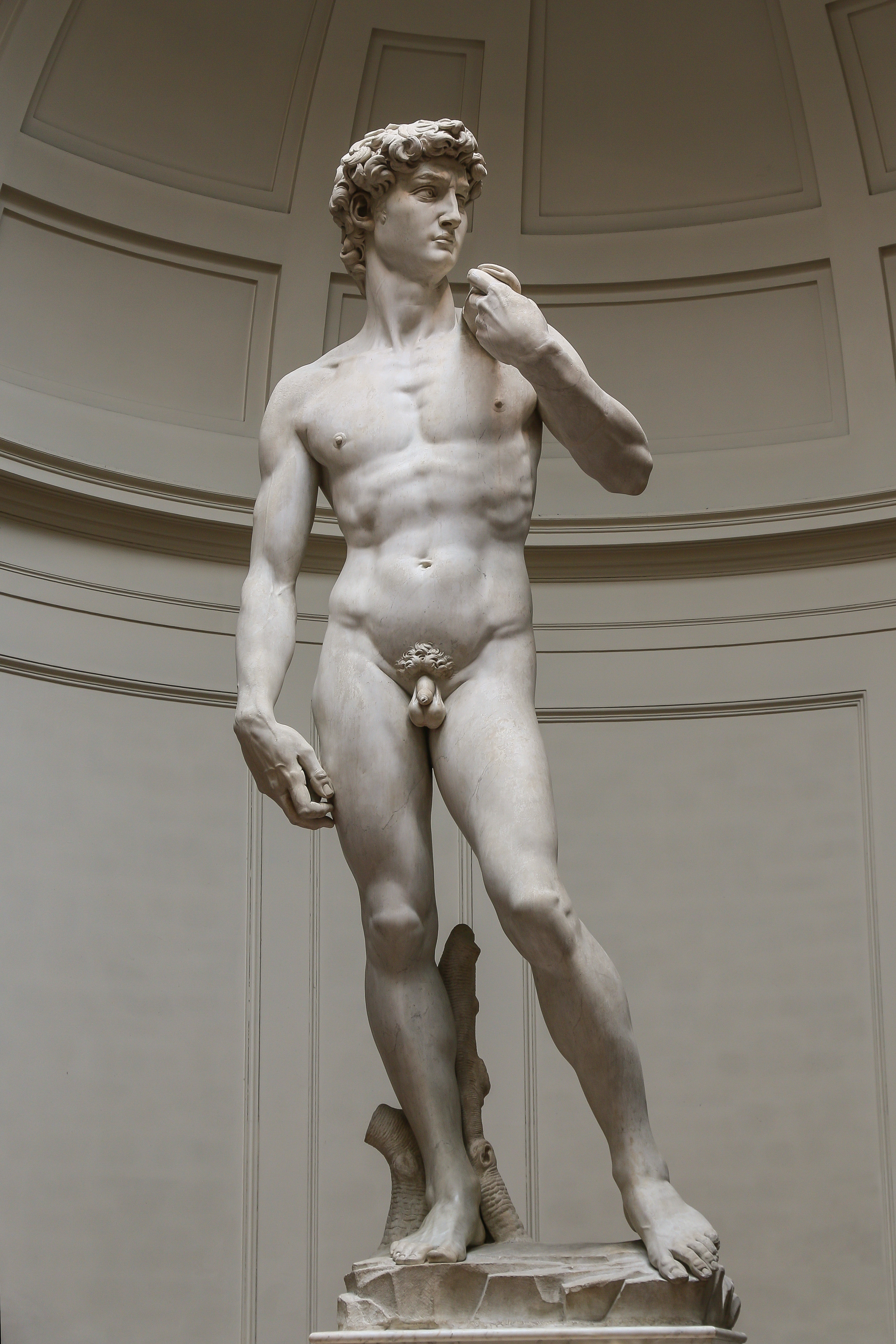
David (1501–1504), by Michelangelo, Galleria dell'Accademia, Florence.

The historical evolution of the nude in art runs parallel to the history of art in general, except for small particularities derived from the different acceptance of nudity by the various societies and cultures that have succeeded each other in the world over time. The nude is an artistic genre that consists of the representation in various artistic media (painting, sculpture, or, more recently, film and photography) of the naked human body. It is considered one of the academic classifications of works of art. Nudity in art has generally reflected the social standards for aesthetics and morality of the era in which the work was made. Many cultures tolerate nudity in art to a greater extent than nudity in real life, with different parameters for what is acceptable: for example, even in a museum where nude works are displayed, nudity of the visitor is generally not acceptable. As a genre, the nude is a complex subject to approach because of its many variants, both formal, aesthetic, and iconographic, and some art historians consider it the most important subject in the history of Western art. (Note: According to Francisco Calvo Serraller, "the nude is not only an art form, but it is the explanation or the very raison d'être of Western art: that dramatic point or intersection between the natural and the celestial, between the ideal and the real, between the carnal and the spiritual, between the body and the soul" (Calvo Serraller (2005, p. 61)). Javier Portús, curator of the Museo del Prado, also believes that "for centuries the nude has been the artistic form par excellence in the West, the one capable of expressing better than any other the values of color and pictorial matter". (Portús, Javier (April 2004). "Pasion por los desnudos" (in Spanish). Archived from the original on 14 December 2014.))

Although it is usually associated with eroticism, the nude can have various interpretations and meanings, from mythology to religion, including anatomical study, or as a representation of beauty and aesthetic ideal of perfection, as in Ancient Greece. Its representation has varied according to the social and cultural values of each era and each people, and just as for the Greeks the body was a source of pride, for the Jews—and therefore for Christianity—it was a source of shame, it was the condition of enslaved people and the miserable.

The study and artistic representation of the human body has been a constant throughout the history of art, from prehistoric times (Venus of Willendorf) to the present day. One of the cultures where the artistic representation of the nude proliferated most was Ancient Greece, where it was conceived as an ideal of perfection and absolute beauty. This concept has endured in classical art to the present day and largely conditioned Western society's perception of the nude and art in general. In the Middle Ages, its representation was limited to religious themes, always based on biblical passages that justified it. In the Renaissance, the new humanist culture, of a more anthropocentric bent, promoted the return of the nude to art, generally based on mythological or historical themes, while religious themes remained. It was in the 19th century, especially with Impressionism, when the nude began to lose its iconographic character and to be represented simply for its aesthetic qualities, the nude as a sensual and fully self-referential image. In more recent times, studies on the nude as an artistic genre have focused on semiotic analyses, especially on the relationship between the work and the viewer, and on gender relations. Feminism has criticized the nude as an objectual use of the female body and a sign of the patriarchal dominance of Western society. Artists such as Lucian Freud and Jenny Saville have elaborated a non-idealized type of nude to eliminate the traditional concept of nudity and seek its essence beyond the concepts of beauty and gender.

== Theoretical Distinction: Nude vs Naked ==
The nude as an artistic genre has been shaped not only by historical and cultural values but also by evolving theoretical interpretations, particularly regarding the distinctions between "nude" and "naked." While "nude" and "naked" are often conflated, they represent distinct concepts in art history. British art historian Kenneth Clark in his book, The Nude: A Study in Ideal Form, argued that "to be naked is to be deprived of our clothes, and the word implies some of the embarrassment most of us feel in that condition. The word 'nude,' on the other hand, carries, in educated usage, no uncomfortable overtone." Clark asserted that "the nude is not the subject of art, but a form of art," suggesting that the human body becomes a "nude" when the artist idealizes and perfects its depiction, rather than simply reproducing it as seen in life.

John Berger later critiqued this distinction in Ways of Seeing, arguing that "a naked body has to be seen as an object in order to become a nude." For Berger, the "nude" reflects a cultural framework that positions the body as an object of display and power dynamics, particularly in relation to gender. Frances Borzello expanded on these ideas in The Naked Nude, introducing the concept of the "naked nude," which combines vulnerability with aesthetic traditions. Some examples that illustrate a "naked nude" includes Chantal Joffe's, Alice Neel's and Lucian Freud's self-portraits; these works highlight the intersection of vulnerability and aesthetic tradition, showcasing the body as both personal and political. This redefinition emphasizes the body as a site for personal, political, and emotional expression, moving beyond traditional notions of idealized perfection.

== Prehistory ==
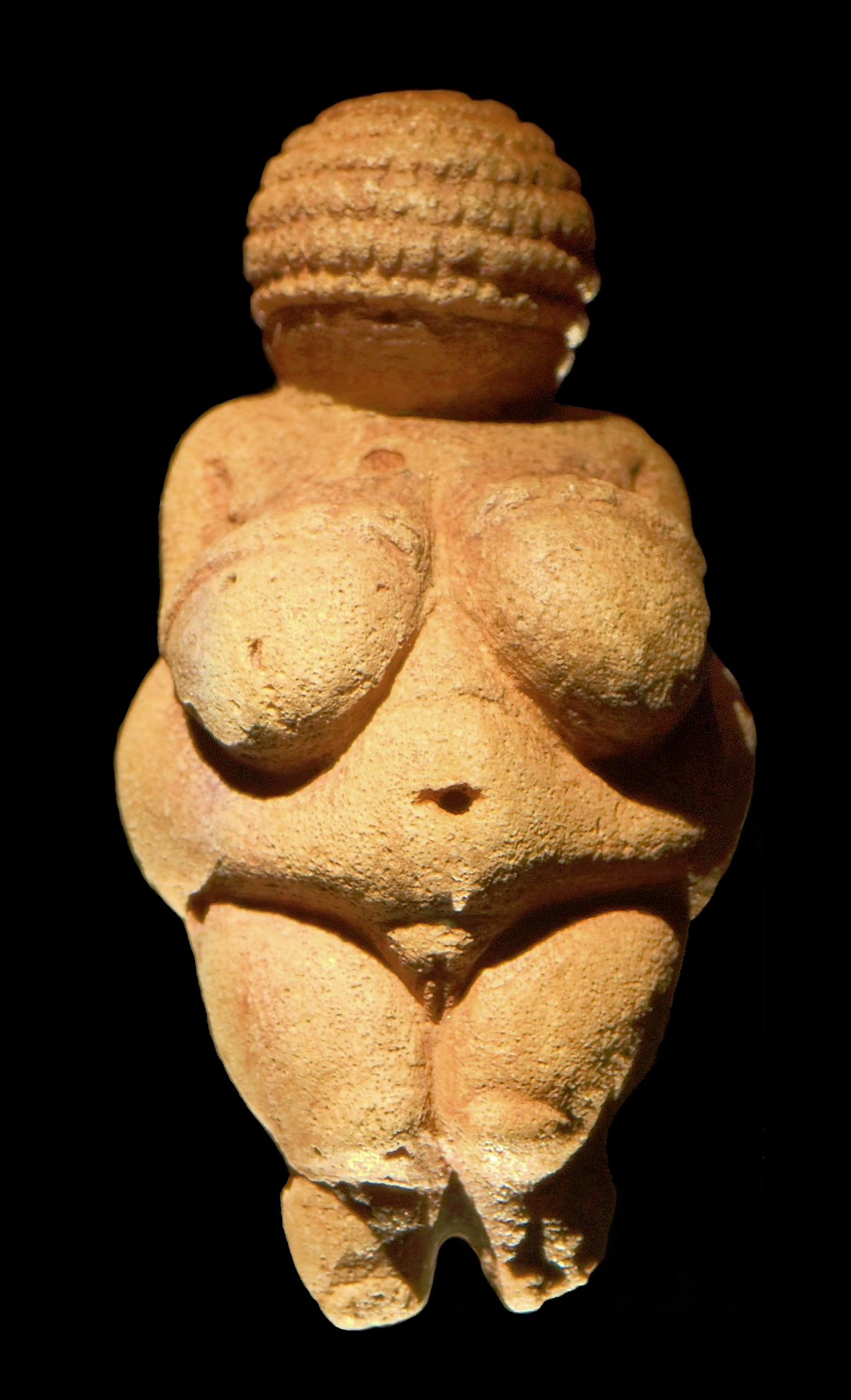
Venus of Willendorf, Natural History Museum, Vienna (c. 20,000 BC).

Prehistoric art is the art developed from the Stone Age (Upper Paleolithic, Mesolithic, and Neolithic) to the Metal Age, periods where the first manifestations that can be considered artistic by humans appeared. In the Paleolithic (25,000– 8000 BC), humans hunted and lived in caves, producing cave paintings. In the Neolithic (6000– 3000 BC), humans developed agriculture, which promoted increasingly complex societies where religion gained importance, and the production of handicrafts began. In the Metal Age (3000–1000 BC), the first protohistoric civilizations emerged.

In Paleolithic art, the nude was strongly linked to the cult of fertility, represented by Venus figurines. Most of them come from the Aurignacian period, and are generally carved in limestone, ivory or steatite. The Venus figureines of Willendorf, Lespugue, Menton, Laussel, etc. stand out. At the male level, the representation of erect phalli in isolated form or in full body was also a sign of fertility, as in the Cerne Abbas Giant (Dorset, England). In cave paintings—especially those developed in the French-Cantabrian and Levantine—hunting scenes are common, or scenes of rites and dances, where the human figure, simplified to stick figures, is sometimes represented highlighting sexual organs. Some examples are found in the caves of El Cogul, Valltorta and Alpera.

== Ancient art ==
This is the name given to the artistic creations of the earliest stage of history, especially those of the great civilizations of the Near East: Egypt and Mesopotamia. It would also include the earliest artistic manifestations of most peoples and civilizations across all continents. One of the great advances in this era was the invention of writing, generated primarily by the need to keep records of an economic and commercial nature.

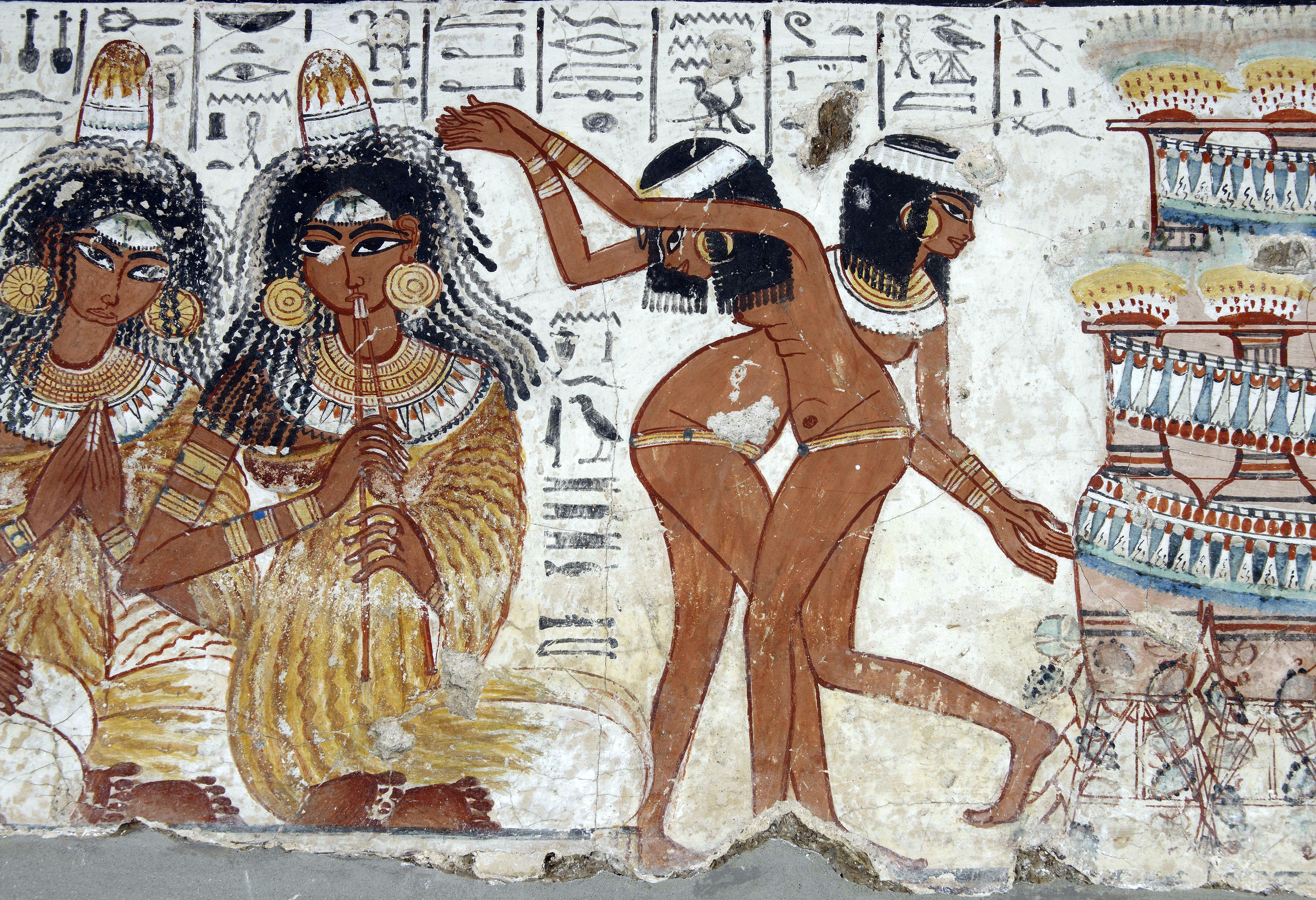
Musicians and dancers (c. 1420–1375 BC), British Museum.

In the first religions, from the Sumerian to the Egyptian, the ancient cult of Mother Earth was related to the new anthropomorphic deities, linking the feminine form with nature, insofar as both are generators of life. Thus, the Egyptian twin gods Geb and Nut represented the earth and the sky, from whose union all the elements were born. In other cases, the gods are related to cosmological elements, such as the goddess Ishtar with the planet Venus, generally represented naked and winged, with a crescent moon on her head. Other representations of the Mother goddess are usually more or less clothed figures, but with bare breasts, such as the famous Snake Goddess (Heraklion Archaeological Museum), a Minoan statuette from around 1550 BC. These representations were the starting point for the iconography of Greek and Roman goddesses such as Artemis, Diana, Demeter and Ceres.

In Egypt, nudity was seen naturally, and abounds in representations of court scenes, especially in dances and scenes of feasts and celebrations. But it is also present in religious themes, and many of their gods represented in anthropomorphic form appear nude or semi-nude in statues and wall paintings. It also appears in the representation of the human being himself, whether pharaoh or slave, military or civil servant, such as the famous Seated Scribe of the Louvre. Undoubtedly due to the climate, the Egyptians used to wear little clothing, loincloths and skirts for men, and transparent linen dresses for women. This is reflected in the art, from the scenes that show the festivities and ceremonies of the court to the more popular scenes, which show the daily work of peasants, artisans, shepherds, fishermen and other trades. Likewise, in the war scenes appear the pitiful naked bodies of slaves and captives, treated with the same hieratic style and lack of dynamism typical of Egyptian art, where the law of frontality prevails, the body constrained to rigid static postures and lack of realism. The painting is characterized mainly by presenting figures juxtaposed in superimposed planes, with a hierarchical criterion. The profile canon predominated, which consisted of representing the head and limbs in profile, but the shoulders and eyes from the front. Among the works that have come down to us from Ancient Egypt, the nude, partial or complete, is perceptible both in painting and sculpture, whether monumental or in small statuettes, such as the Louvre's Offeror or the British Museum's Girl Playing a Harp; we have statues such as those of Rahotep and Nofret, the King Menkaure (Mycerinus) and queen or Louvre's Lady Touy that, although dressed in linen, the transparency of the fabric shows her nudity; in painting, the murals of the tomb of Nath, accountant of Thutmose IV, or the Tomb of the Physicians in Saqqarah. In the tomb of Tutankhamun was found a statue of the pharaoh naked, representing Ihy, son of the goddess Hathor.

On the other hand, in Mesopotamia, geographically and chronologically close to Ancient Egypt, the nude is practically unknown, except for some Assyrian reliefs such as Lion Hunt of Ashurbanipal (British Museum), where the king appears with a naked torso, or some scenes of torture of prisoners, while on the female side we only find the naked breasts of a Chaldean bronze representing a young Canaephora, present in the Louvre. Nor do we find nudes in Phoenician or Jewish art, where the Mosaic law forbade human representation.

== Classical art ==
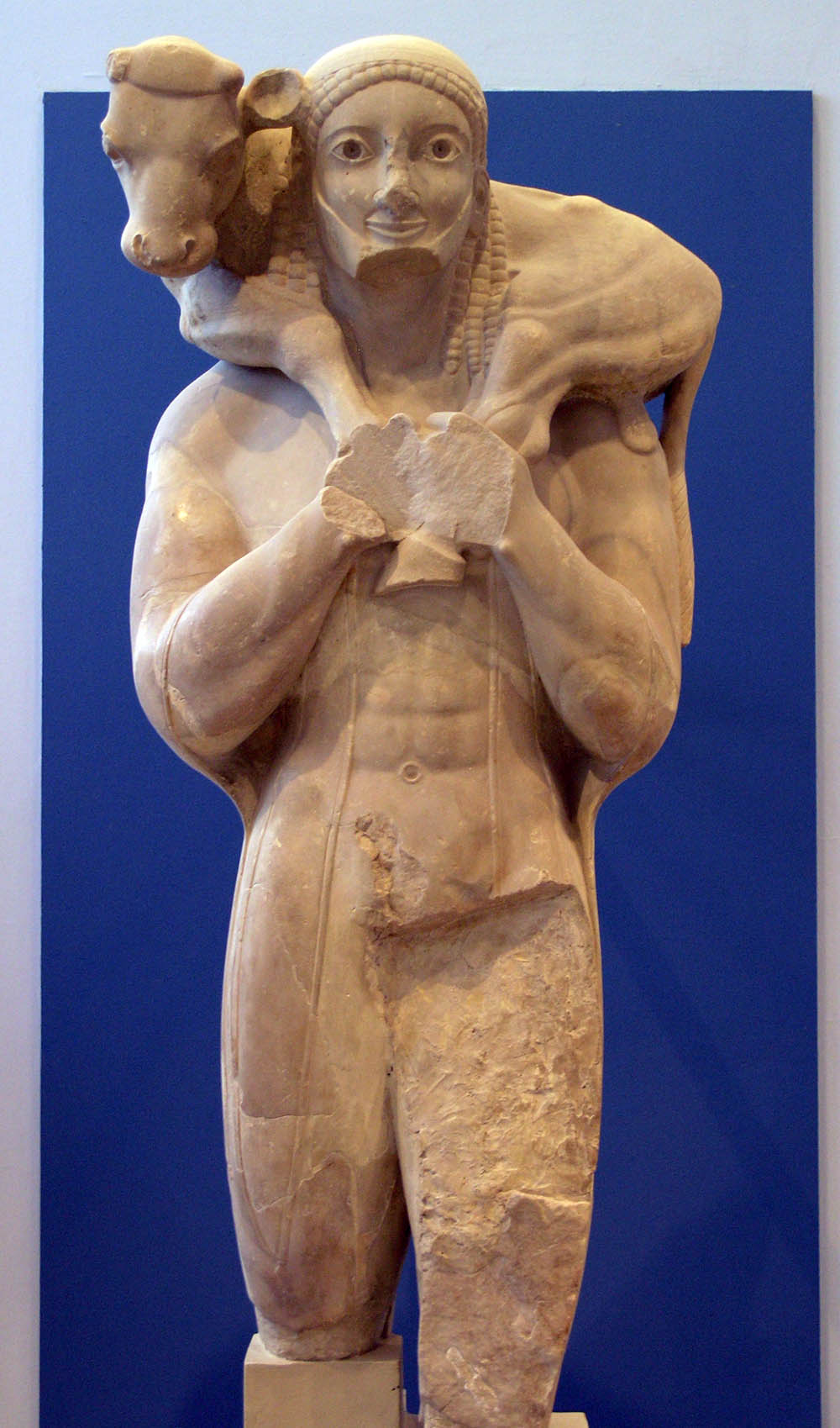
The Acropolis Moschophoros, c. 570 BC. A young man carrying a calf to sacrifice is shown in full frontal nudity; however, he is partially clothed with a ceremonial cloth covering his back, upper arms, and front thighs.

Classical art (Note: Derived from the Latin classicus ("first class"), the term "classical" referred to the period of Greek art between the Archaic and Hellenistic periods, valued as the most creative in the history of Greek art. Thus, the term became synonymous with creativity, excellence, the best period of any artistic style, so that many styles over time have had a phase called "classical". Heinrich Wölfflin, for example, referred to classical art when speaking of the Italian Renaissance (Chilvers (2007, p. 207)).) is the art developed in ancient Greece and Rome, whose scientific, material and aesthetic advances contributed to the history of art a style based on nature and the human being, where harmony and balance, the rationality of forms and volumes, and a sense of imitation ("mimesis") of nature prevailed, laying the foundations of Western art, so that the recurrence to classical forms has been constant throughout history in Western civilization.

=== Greece ===
The main artistic manifestations that have marked the evolution of Western art were developed in Greece. After the beginnings of the Minoan and Mycenaean cultures, Greek art developed in three periods: archaic, classical, and Hellenistic. Characterized by naturalism and the use of reason in measurements and proportions, and with an aesthetic sense inspired by nature, Greek art was the starting point for the art developed on the European continent. The high point of Greek art occurred in the so called Age of Pericles, where art enjoyed great splendor, generating a style of interpreting reality: artists were based on nature according to proportions and rules (κανών, canon) that allowed the capture of that reality by the viewer, resorting if necessary to foreshortening. A concept of beauty was pursued based on the imitation of the natural, but idealized with the incorporation of a subjective vision that reflected the harmony of body and soul, equating beauty with goodness (καλοκαγαθία, kalokagathía).

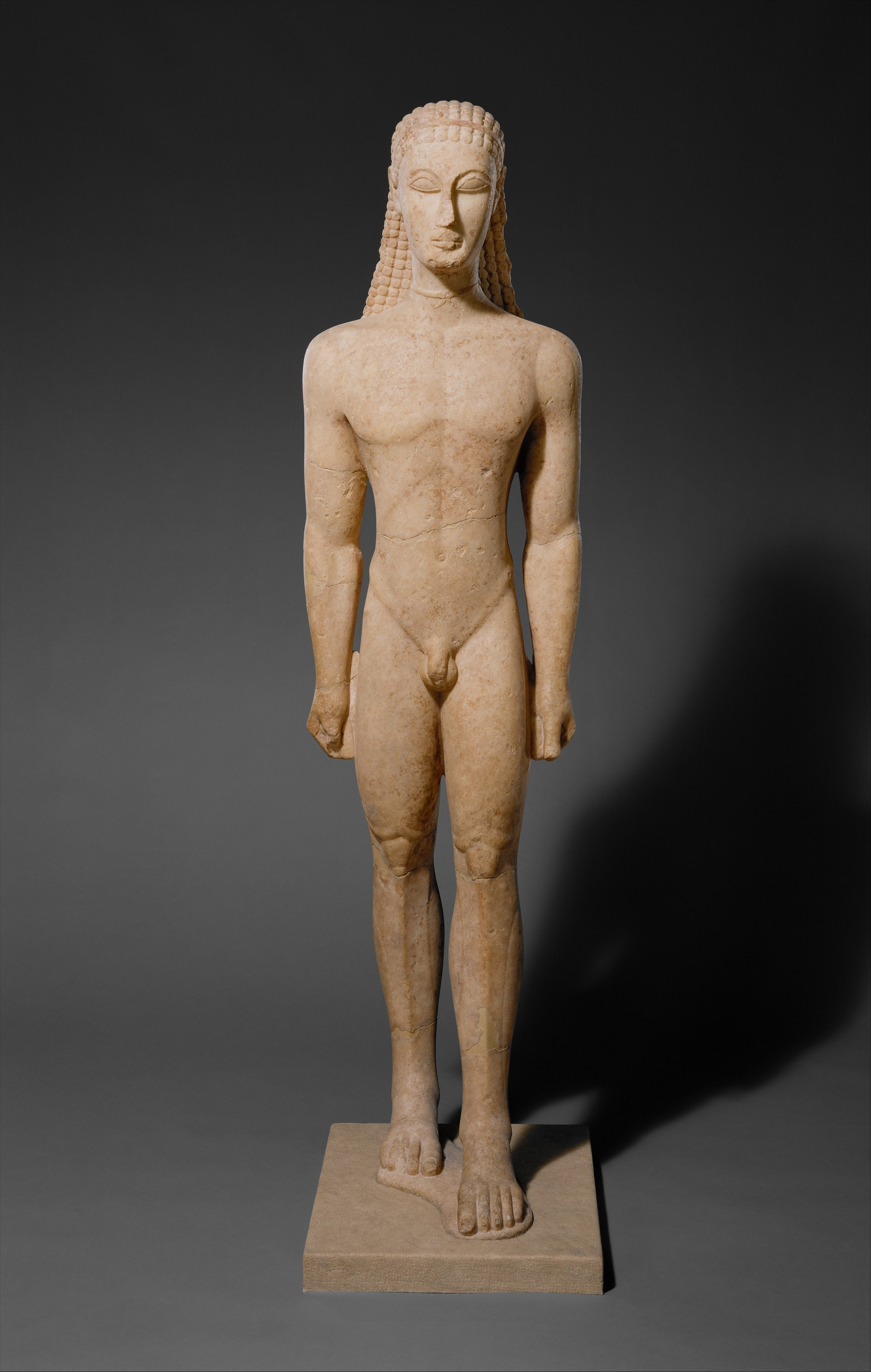
Marble statue of a kouros (c. 590 BC–580 BC), Metropolitan Museum of Art, New York City.

Greece was the first place where the human body was represented in a naturalistic way, far from the hieratism and schematization of previous cultures. Greek culture was humanistic, the human being was the main object of study of their philosophy and art, since their religion was more mythological than an object of worship. For the Greeks, the ideal of beauty was the naked male body, which symbolized youth and virility, like the athletes of the Olympic Games, who competed naked. The Greek nude was both naturalistic and idealized: naturalistic in the faithful representation of the parts of the body, but idealized in the search for harmonious and balanced proportions, rejecting a more realistic representation that would show the body's imperfections or wrinkles of age. From a more schematic composition in the archaic period, the study of the body evolved towards a more detailed description of the skeleton and muscles, as well as the movement and the different positions and twists that the human body can perform. The description of the face and the representation of states of mind were also perfected.

The Greeks attached great importance to the naked body, of which they were proud, since it was not only the reflection of good physical health, but also the recipient of virtue and honesty, as well as a component of social advancement, as opposed to the inhibitions of other, less civilized peoples. For the Greeks, nudity was an expression of integrity; nothing related to the human being as a whole could be eluded or isolated. They related body and spirit, which for them were indissolubly united, in such a way that even their religiosity materialized in anthropomorphic gods. They related apparently antagonistic elements, and just as something as abstract as mathematics could provide them with sensory pleasure, something material like the body could become a symbol of something ethereal and immortal. Thus, the nude had a moral component that avoided simple sensualism, so it did not seem obscene or decadent to them, as it did to the Romans. This interrelation between body and spirit is inherent to Greek art, and when artists of later times imitated the Greek nude—as in the case of neoclassicism and academicism—stripped of this component, they produced lifeless works, focused on physical perfection, but without moral virtue.

In the Greek male nude, it is essential to capture the energy and vital force they transmitted through two types of virile nudes: the athlete and the hero. At the Olympic Games it was customary to give the winner a ceramic vase—the "panathenaic amphorae"—with representations of the athletic discipline exercised by the winner, an excellent example of nude representations in movement, in scenes of action of great dynamism.

The first exponent of the male nude is a type of figures representing athletes, gods or mythological heroes, called kouros (kouroi in plural), belonging to the Archaic period (7th century–5th century BC)—their female variant is the kore (korai in plural), which, however, they used to represent dressed. Although these figures originated from Egypt, the Greek sculptors soon followed their own path, seeking the best way to represent the human body and convey their ideal of beauty. The kouros is characterized by the hieratic posture, where frontality predominates, with the feet on the ground and the left leg forward, arms close to the body and hands closed, and the head of cubic shape, with a long mane and basic facial features, highlighting its characteristic smile, called "archaic smile". The first examples date back to the 7th century BC, from places such as Delos, Naxos, and Samos, generally appearing in tombs and places of worship. Later, they spread to Attica and the Peloponnese, where they became more naturalistic, with descriptive features and greater interest in modeling. Some works that have survived to the present day are: the Kouros of Sounion (600 BC), the Cleobis and Biton Twins (600–590 BC), the Moschophoros (570 BC), the Rampin Horseman (550 BC), the Kouros of Tenea (550 BC), the Kouros of Anafi (530 BC), the Kouros of Aristodikos (500 BC), etc.

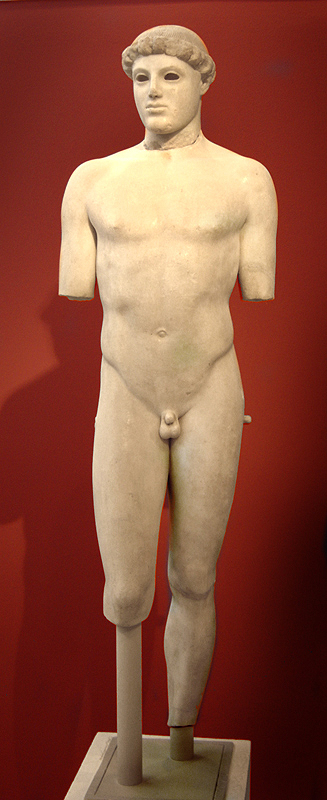
Ephebe of Kritios (c. 480 BC), Acropolis Museum, Athens.

Subsequently, the nude evolved from the rigid, geometric forms of the kouroi to the soft, naturalistic lines of the classical period (the severe style, developed between 490 BC and 450 BC). The main factor in this innovation was a new concept in conceiving sculpture, moving from idealization to imitation. This change began to be noticed in the first years of the 5th century BC, with works such as the Apollo of Piombino (c. 490 BC), the Ephebe of Kritios (c. 480 BC) or the Tyrannicides Group, representing Harmodius and Aristogeiton, work of Kritios and Nesiotes (c. 477 BC). In these works, the cult of physical perfection is denoted, expressed mainly through athleticism, which combined physical vigor with moral virtue and religiosity. The new classical style brought greater naturalness not only formal, but also vital, by providing movement to the human figure, especially with the introduction of the contrapposto—generally attributed to Kritios—where the various parts of the body are harmoniously opposed, and which provides rhythm and balance to the figure. With these premises, the main figures of classical Greek sculpture emerged: Myron, Phidias, Polyclitus, Praxiteles, Scopas, Lysippos, etc.

Myron made with his Discobolus (450 BC) a magnificent example of figure in movement, achieving for the first time a coordinated dynamic effect for the whole figure, since until then the figures in movement were made in parts, without a global vision that provided coherence to the dynamic action—as in the case of the Poseidon of Cape Artemision, bronze figure of Attic origin from around 470 BC, in which the torso is static, not following the movement of the arms.

Phidias was especially dedicated to sculptures of gods—he was called the "maker of gods"—especially Apollo, which he treated with a mixture of naturalism and certain vestiges of the archaic hieratic frontality, which gave his figures an aura of majesty, with a balanced harmony between strength and grace, form and ideal, as in the Apollo of Kassel (c. 450 BC). However, he also produced works of ordinary characters, with a more human, less idealized treatment, such as his figure of Anacreon (c. 450 BC).

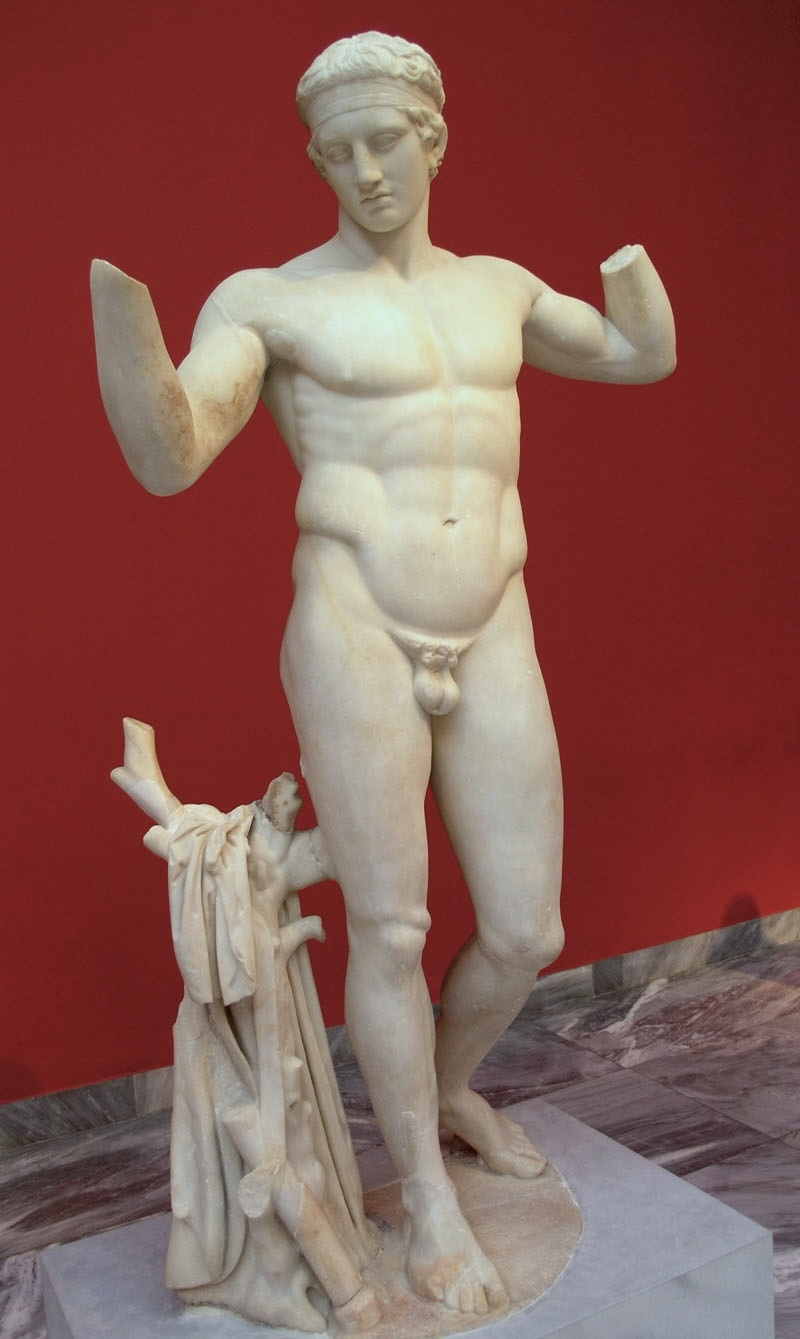
Diadumene (430 BC), by Polyclitus, National Archaeological Museum of Athens.

Polyclitus' work had a special relevance in the standardization of a canon of geometric proportions on which his figures were based, together with the search for balance within movement, as can be seen in his two main works, the Doriphorus (440 BC) and the Diadumene (430 BC)—unfortunately, only Roman copies of his works have come down to us. Another important contribution of Polyclitus was the anatomical study (the diarthrosis or articulation of the various parts of the body), especially of the musculation: the perfection of his torsos has led them to be nicknamed in French cuirasse esthétique ("aesthetic armor"), and they have long served for the design of armor.

Praxiteles designed more human figures (Apollo Saurochthonus, 360 BC; Resting Satyr, 365 BC; Hermes and the Infant Dionysus, 340 BC), with graceful movements, with a latent sensuality, combining physical power with a certain air of grace, almost sweetness, with a fluid and delicate design.

Later, Greek sculpture lost, in a certain way, this union between the physical and the ideal, moving towards more slender, muscular figures, where action predominated over moral expression. This can be seen in works such as the Ephebe of Antikythera (340 BC), the Athlete with Strigil of Ephesus, and the Ephebe of Marathon. Among the artists who excelled in this period is Scopas, author of the frieze of the Mausoleum of Halicarnassus, full of moving figures, such as his Greeks and Amazons (c. 350 BC), where the use of clothing is characteristic—especially the cloaks of the Greeks, who otherwise wear the rest of the body naked—to give the sensation of movement. He also worked on the Leochares Mausoleum, author of the famous Apollo of Belvedere (c. 330–300 BC), considered the best ancient sculpture by the neoclassicists, which inspired many modern artists, such as Dürer's Adam (1504), Bernini's Apollo and Daphne (1622–1625), Canova's Perseus Triumphant (1801) and Thomas Crawford's Orpheus (1838). In the Mausoleum the so called "heroic diagonal" was introduced, a posture in which the action runs through the whole body from the feet to the hands following a pronounced diagonal, and that would be reproduced assiduously in the future—as in the Borghese Gladiator by Agasio of Ephesus (3rd century BC) or the Dioscuri of the Quirinal, reaching the Hercules and Theseus by Canova.

Lysippos, perhaps the last great name in Greek sculpture, introduced a new canon of proportions, with a smaller head, a more slender body and long legs, as in his main work, the Apoxymenos (325 BC), or in the Agias (337 BC), in Eros drawing the bow (335 BC) and Heracles at rest (320 BC). He also introduced a new conception of the human figure, less idealistic, more focused on the everyday and anecdotal, as his figure of an athlete scratching, the Hermes resting (330–320 BC) of Naples, or the Berlin Adorant. Lysippos was the portraitist of Alexander the Great, of whom he made several statues, several of them nude, as in the Alexander with the spear of the Louvre (330 BC).

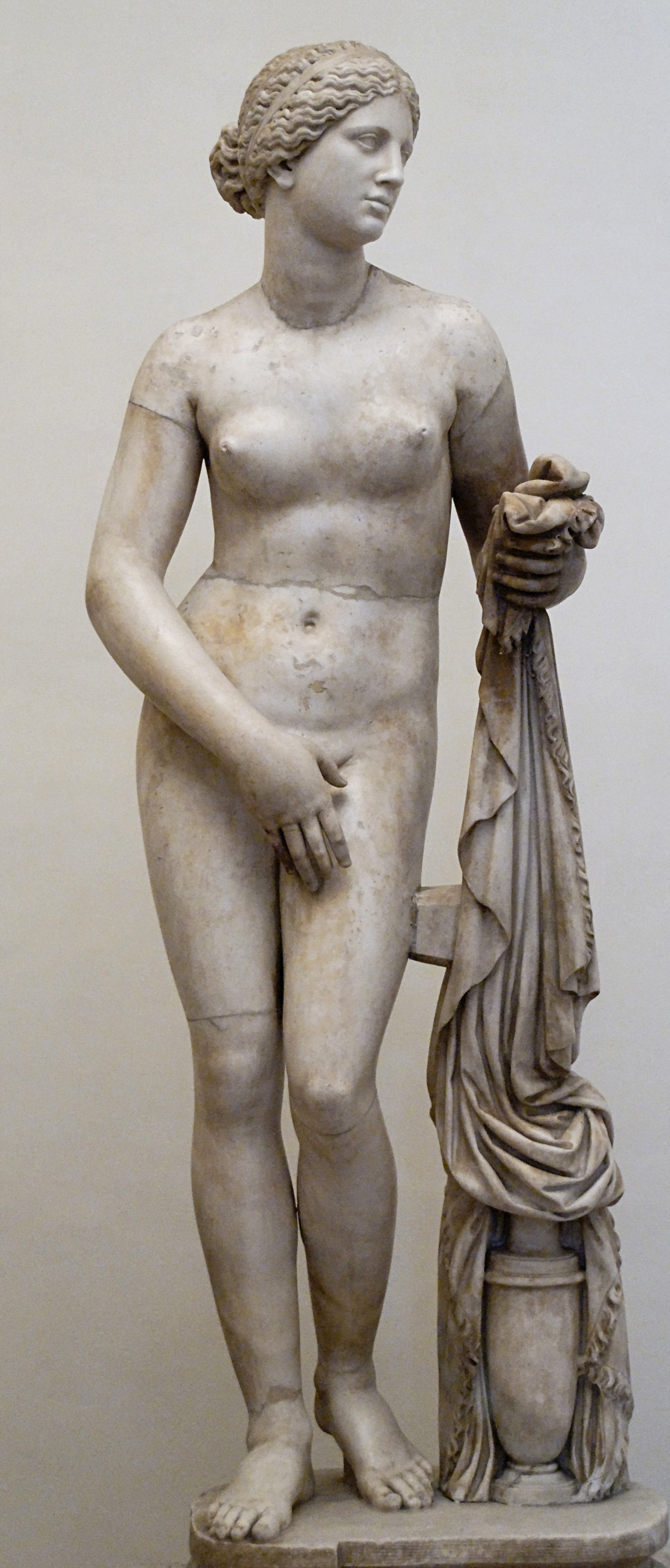
Aphrodite of Cnidus (c. 350 BC), by Praxiteles, copy called Altemps or Ludovisi, Museo Nazionale Romano-Palazzo Altemps.

The female nude was less frequent, especially in archaic times, where the nudity of the kouroi contrasted with the clothed figures of the korai. Just as Western art has considered—preferably since the Renaissance—the female nude a more normal and pleasant subject than the male nude, in Greece, certain religious and moral aspects prohibited female nudity—as can be seen in the famous trial of Phryne, Praxiteles' model. Socially, in Greece, women were relegated to housework, and in contrast to the nudity of male athletics, women had to be dressed from head to toe. Only in Sparta did women participate in athletic competitions, wearing a short tunic that showed their thighs, a fact that was scandalous in the rest of Greece. The earliest traces of female nudity date to the 6th century BC, in everyday scenes painted on ceramic vessels. In the 5th century BC, the first sculptural traces appeared, such as the Venus of the Esquiline, which probably represented a priestess of Isis. It presents a crude and poorly elaborated anatomy, robust and of short stature, but it already contains mathematical proportions, based on the canon of the seven-headed stature.

The subsequent evolution of the female nude was sporadic, with hardly any full nude figures, but partial or with the technique of draperie mouillée ("wet cloths"), light dresses and attached to the body, such as the Aphrodite of the Ludovisi Throne, the Niké of Paeonius (425 BC), or the Venus Genetrix of the Museo delle Terme in Rome. Around 400 BC a bronze figure of a girl was sculpted (Munich Museum), by an anonymous author, which presents the classical contrapposto, giving the female figure a sinuosity—especially in the arch of the hip, which in French is called déhanchement ("swinging")—that enhanced her figure and would remain as an almost archetypal model of representation of the female figure.

The main classical sculptor who dealt with the female nude was Praxiteles, author of the famous Aphrodite of Cnidus (c. 350 BC), represented at the moment of entering the bath, with the dress still in one hand. It is an image that combines sensuality with mysticism, physical pleasure with spiritual evocation, and that was a material realization of the ideal of Greek feminine beauty. He was also the author of another famous image, that of the goddess Aphrodite with legs wrapped in garments and bare breasts, which has come down to us through several copies, the most complete being the so-called Venus of Arles in the Louvre, but which is most famous for the copy of an anonymous artist of about 100 BC, the Venus of Milo. The subsequent evolution of the female nude led to typologies such as the "Venus Pudica", which covers her nudity with her arms, as seen in the Capitoline Venus—sometimes attributed to Praxiteles himself—or the Venus Calypigia ("of beautiful buttocks"), which lifts her peplos to reveal her hips and buttocks, of which a Roman copy of a Hellenistic original has come down to us, now in the National Archaeological Museum of Naples.

A genre where the female nude abounded a little more was in the representation of bacchanals and Dionysian rites, where along with the satyrs and sylenes appeared a whole chorus of maenads and nereids in sensual and unbridled postures, whose scenes were widely represented in funerary sarcophagi, and was a frequent theme in the sculptural workshop of Scopas, author of several figures related to the cult of Dionysus, such as the Maenad of Dresden. In particular, the nereid figures gained great popularity and influenced subsequent art produced throughout the Mediterranean. As a symbol of the liberated soul, their representation became a frequent ornamental motif in various artistic techniques, from painting and sculpture to jewelry, cameos, ceramic vases and cups, chests, sarcophagi, etc. In the late Roman Empire, it was widely diffused, found from Ireland to the Arabian Peninsula, and reaching as far as India, where we see its forms in the figures of flying gandharvas. Even in the Middle Ages, its typology was identified with the character of Eve.

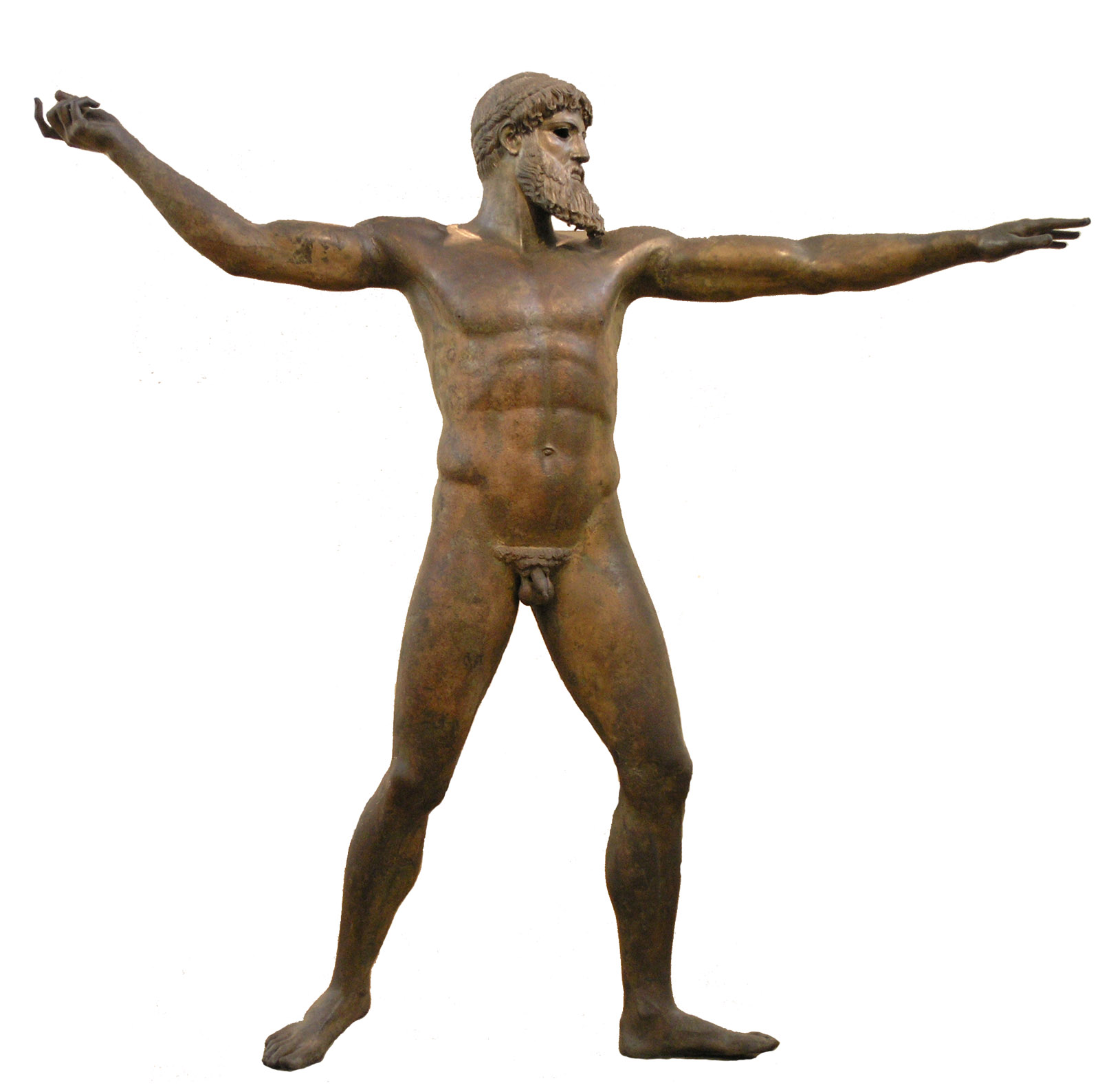
Artemision Bronze, Cape Artemision (470 BC), National Archaeological Museum, Athens.

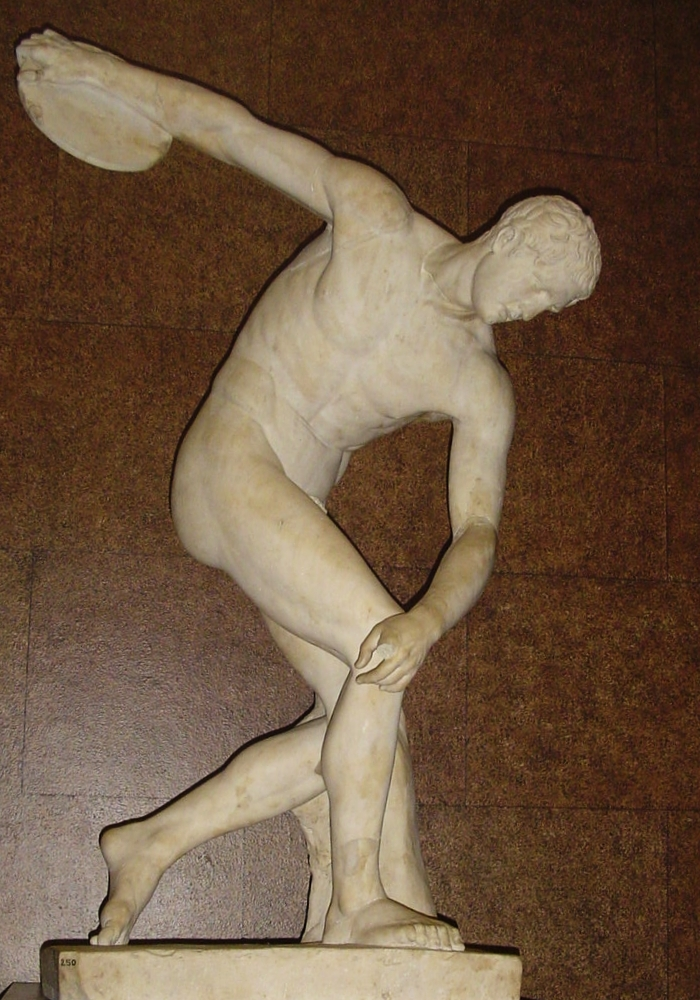
Discobolus of Myron (455 BC), British Museum, London.

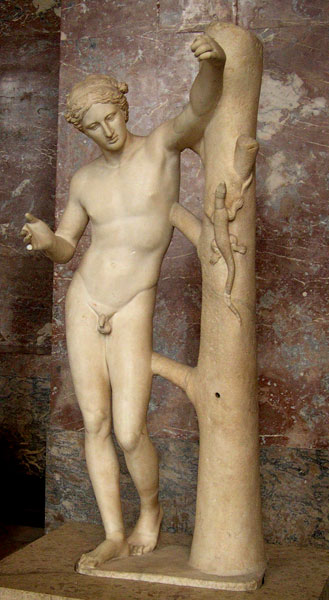
Apollo Saurochthonus (360 BC), by Praxiteles, Louvre Museum, Paris.

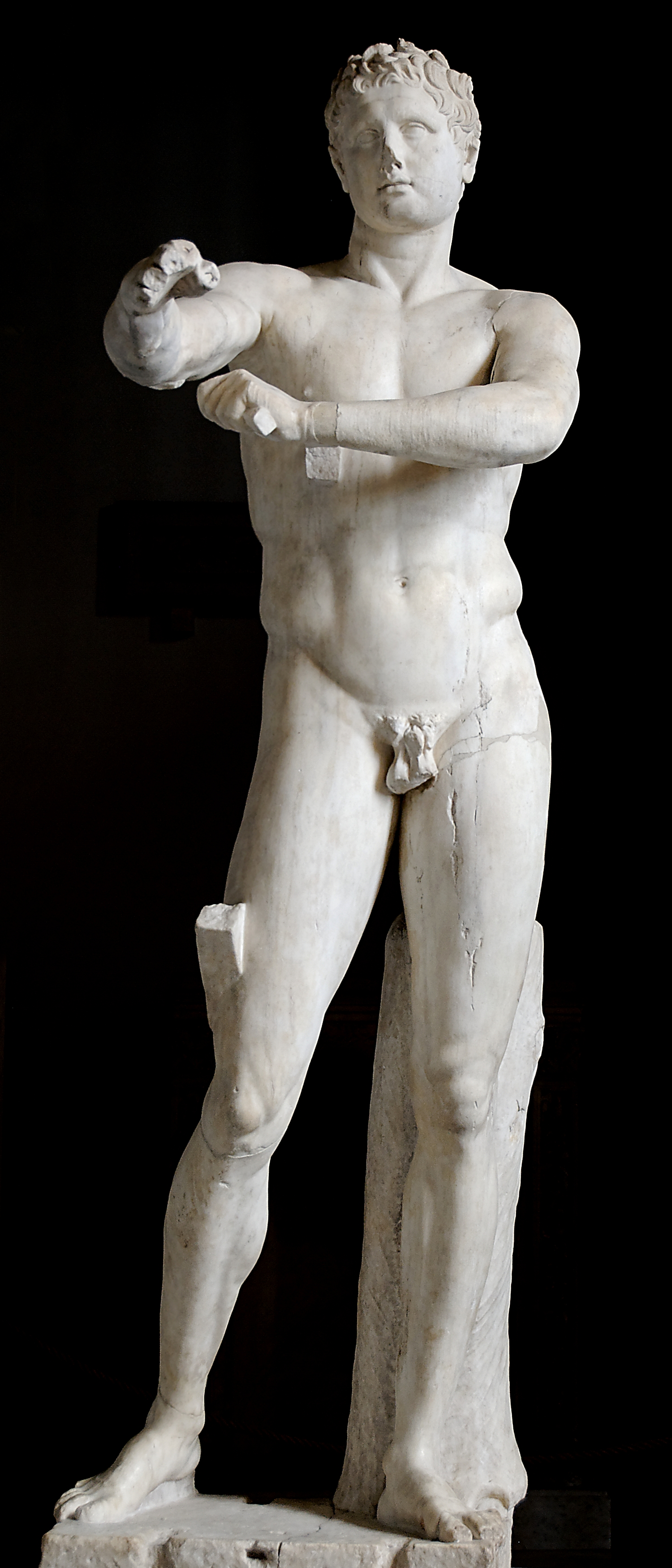
Apoxyomenos (c. 340–330 BC) by Lysippos, Museo Pio-Clementino, Vatican.

During the Hellenistic period—beginning with the death of Alexander the Great, when Greek culture expanded throughout the eastern Mediterranean—the figures acquired greater dynamism and a twist in movement, denoting heightened emotion and tragic expression, breaking the serene balance of the classical period. In contrast to the vital and triumphant energy of heroes and athletes, pathos emerged, the expression of defeat, of drama, of suffering, of battered and deformed, sick or mutilated bodies. If heroes and athletes were victors, now man is subdued by fate, suffers the wrath of the gods, the divine prevails over the material, the spirit over the body. This is seen in myths such as the slaughter of the sons of Niobe, the agony of Marsyas, the death of the hero (as Hector or Meleager), or the fate of Laocoön, frequent themes in the art of the time.

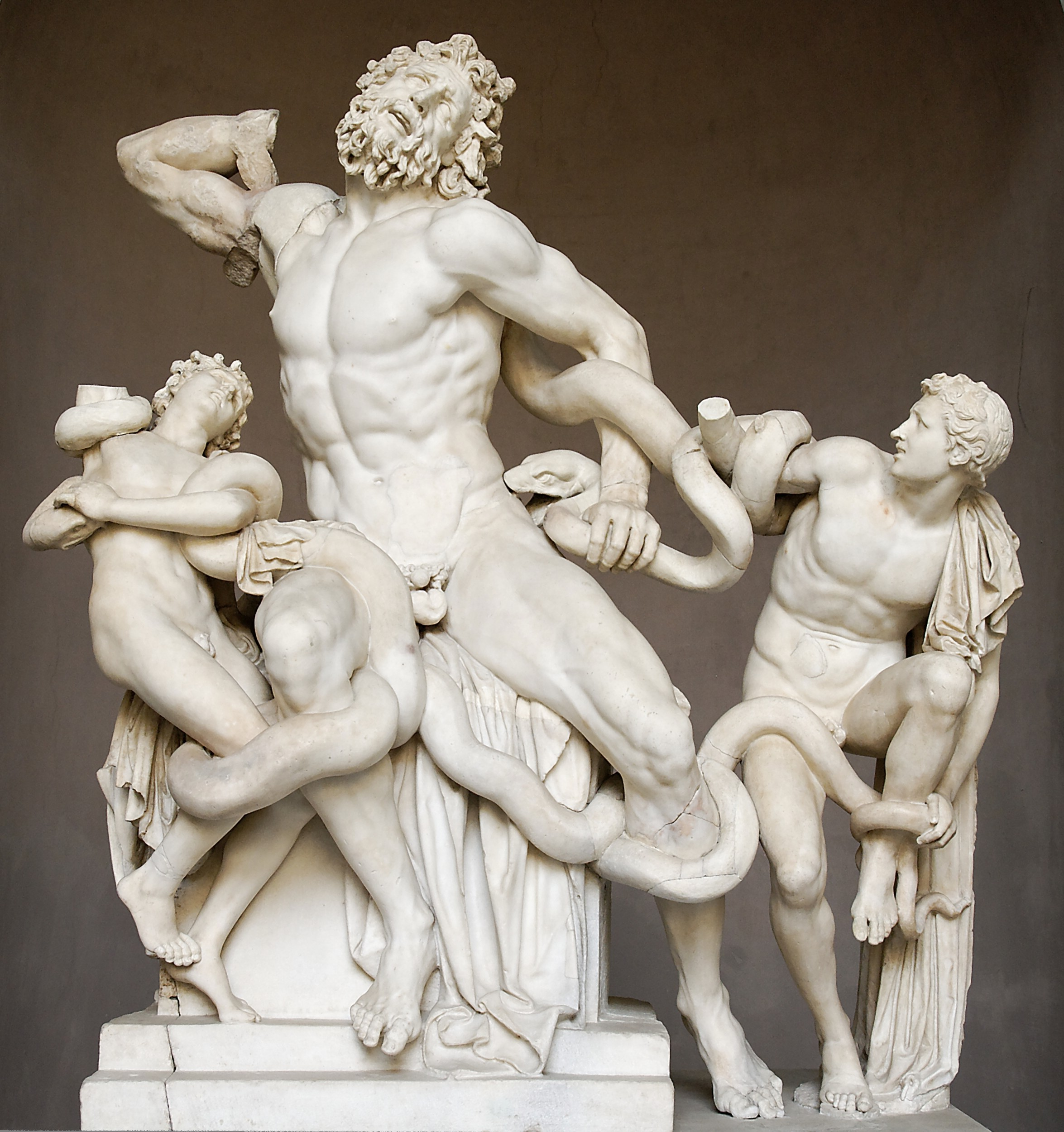
Laocoön and His Sons, by Agesander, Athenodorus and Polydorus of Rhodes (2nd century BC), Pio-Clementine Museum, Vatican.

One of the first production centers of Hellenistic sculpture was Pergamon, whose workshop of sculptors from all over Greece established a style that, starting from a clear Lysipian influence, imprinted a dramatism to their figures that, primarily through the twisting of the body, expressed effectively the pain of the characters, as seen in the Dying Gaul of the Capitoline Museum (230 BC), the Ludovisi Gaul of the Museo delle Terme (230 BC), Menelaus supporting the body of Patroclus of the Loggia dei Lanzi (230–200 BC), also called Pasquino Group) or in the Marsyas of the Conservatory of Rome (230–200 BC). His masterpiece is the Laocoön and His Sons, by Agesander, Athenodorus and Polydorus of Rhodes (2nd century BC), perhaps the best expression of pathos in all history, where the variegated movement, the twisting of the intertwined figures (father, sons and snakes), the exacerbated emotion, the marked muscles of the torso and thighs of the central figure, the dramatic expression of the faces, confer a general sense of latent tragedy, which undoubtedly provokes in the viewer a feeling of terror and despair, of pity for these suffering figures. According to Pliny, the Laocoön is "the best of all works of painting and sculpture".

Also from the Hellenistic period is the Farnese Bull, by Apollonius and Tauriscus of Tralles, a copy of an earlier work entitled The Suffering of Dirce (130 BC). It is a dynamic group, of great expressive effect, where on a landscape base are the animals, of great realism, the young, in a somewhat rigid attitude, and the figure of Dirce, with a complex spiral twist of great dramatic effect. Another famous work of the period is the Crouching Venus of Doidalsas of Bithynia (3rd century BC), highly valued in antiquity and of which numerous copies were made to decorate palaces, gardens, and public buildings. Today there are several copies in museums around the world, and several copies or versions have been made in modern art—mainly Renaissance—such as those of Giambologna, Antoine Coysevox and Jean-Baptiste Carpeaux, or even in drawing or engraving, such as those of Marcantonio Raimondi and Maarten van Heemskerck. Rubens was also inspired by this figure for several of his works. Equally important was the Sleeping Hermaphrodite of Polycles (2nd century BC), whose original bronze was lost, there are several copies made in Roman times, of which one of the most famous is the Borghese Hermaphrodite, found in the Baths of Diocletian in the early seventeenth century and restored by Bernini. There are several copies, some made in modern times, such as the one commissioned by Philip IV of Spain, now in the Prado, which surely influenced Velázquez's Venus at her Mirror.

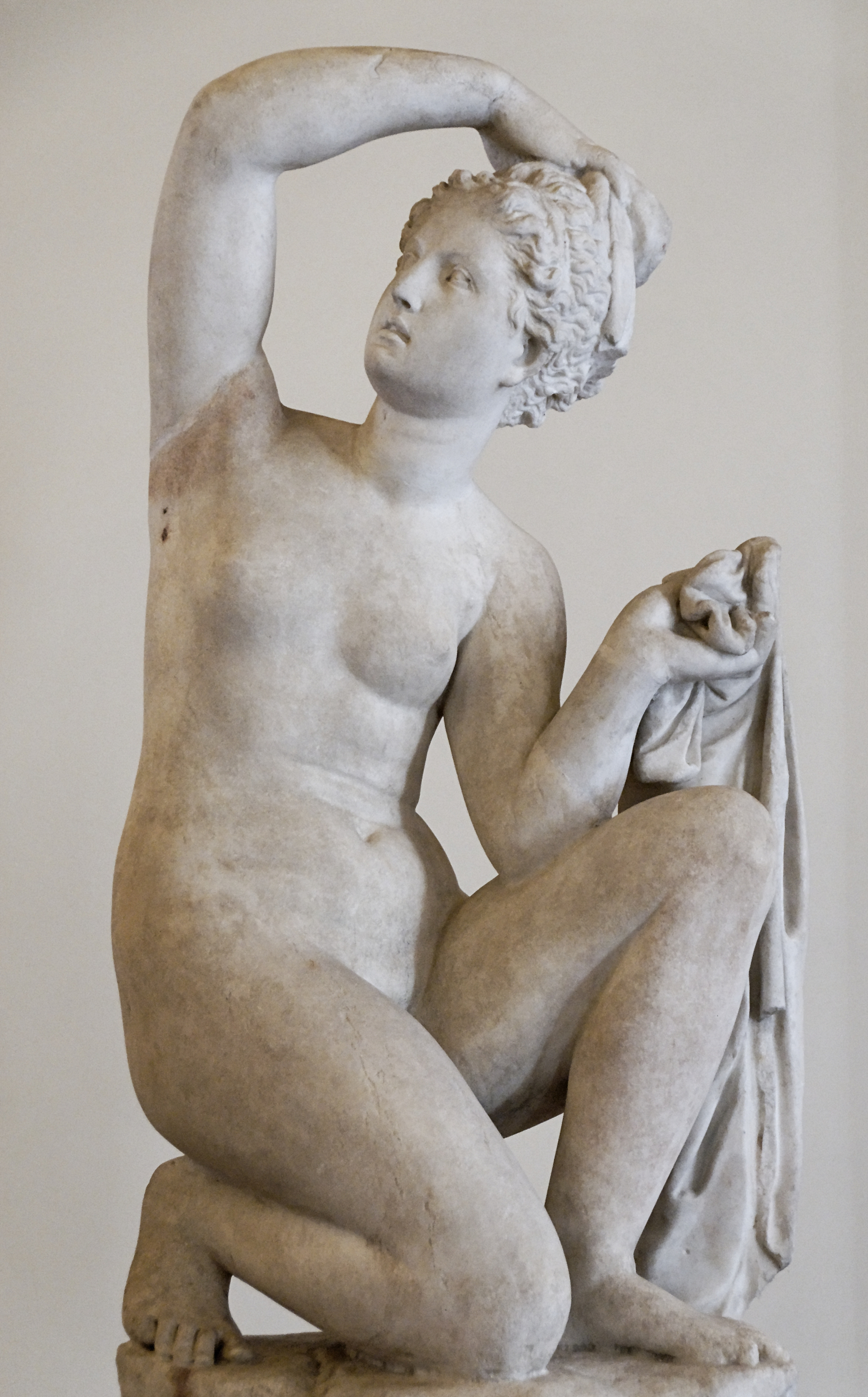
Crouching Venus (3rd century BC), by Diodalsas of Bithynia, Museo Nazionale Romano di Palazzo Altemps.

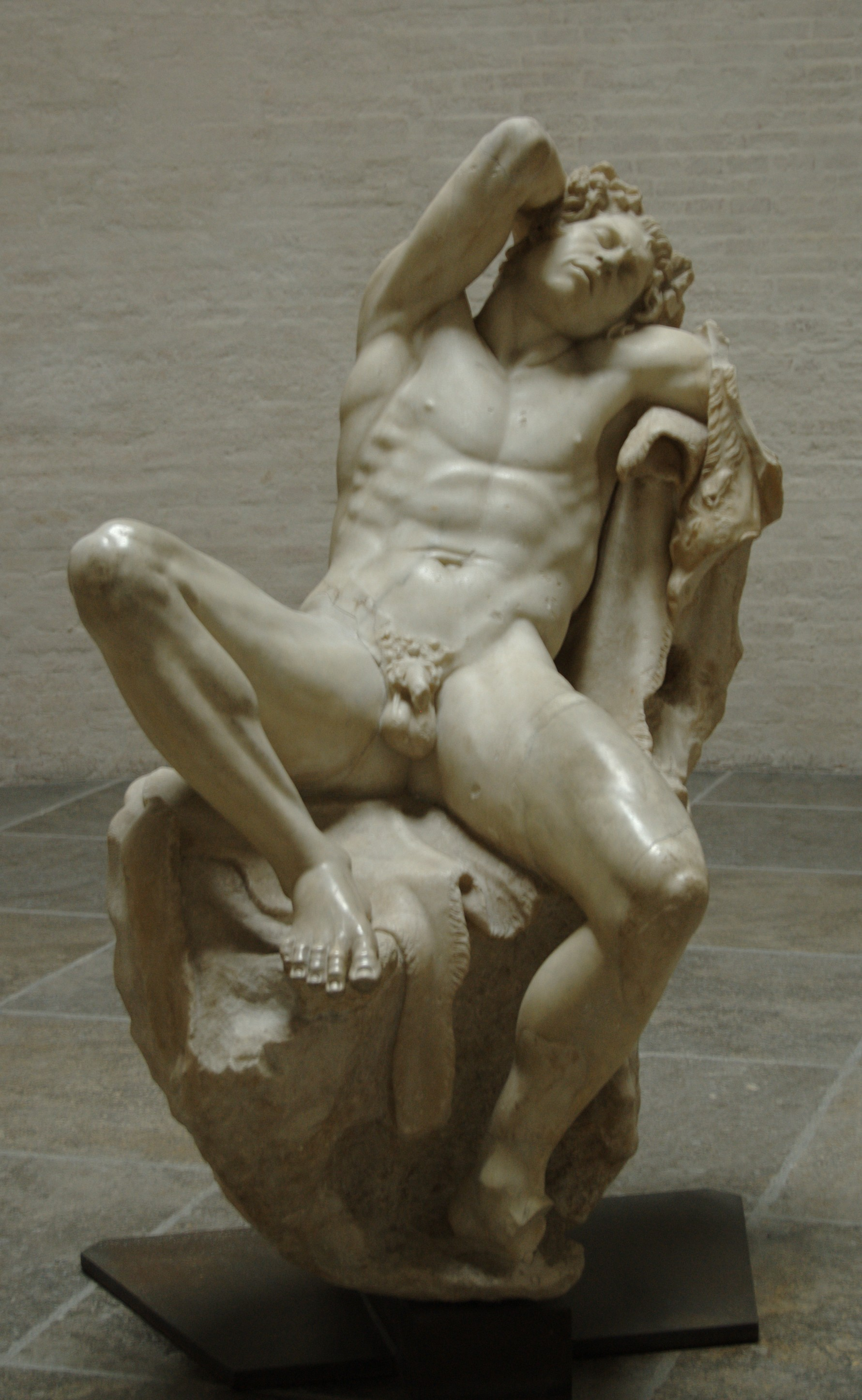
Sleeping Satyr or Barberini Faun (200 B.C.), Munich Glyptothek.

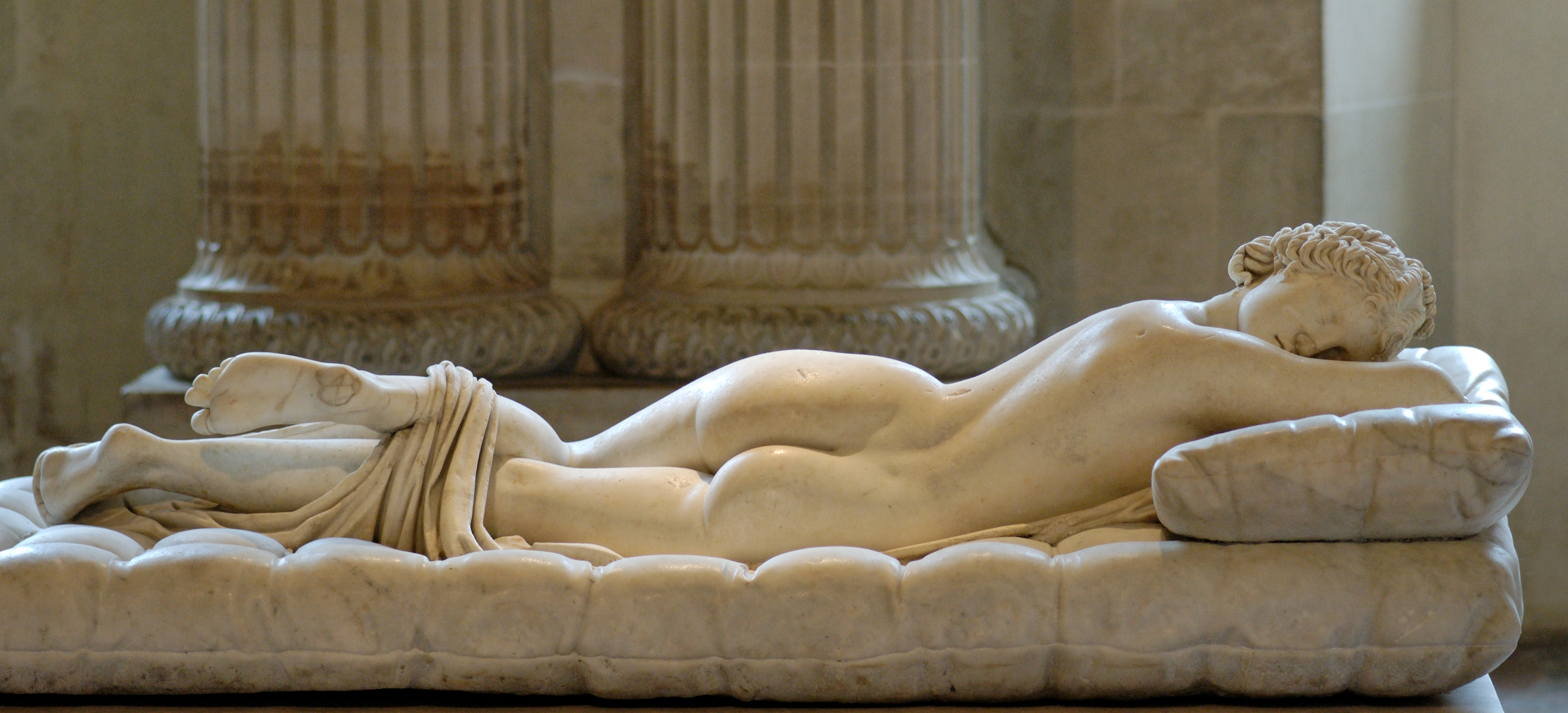
Borghese hermaphroditus (2nd century BC), by Polycles, Musée du Louvre, Paris.

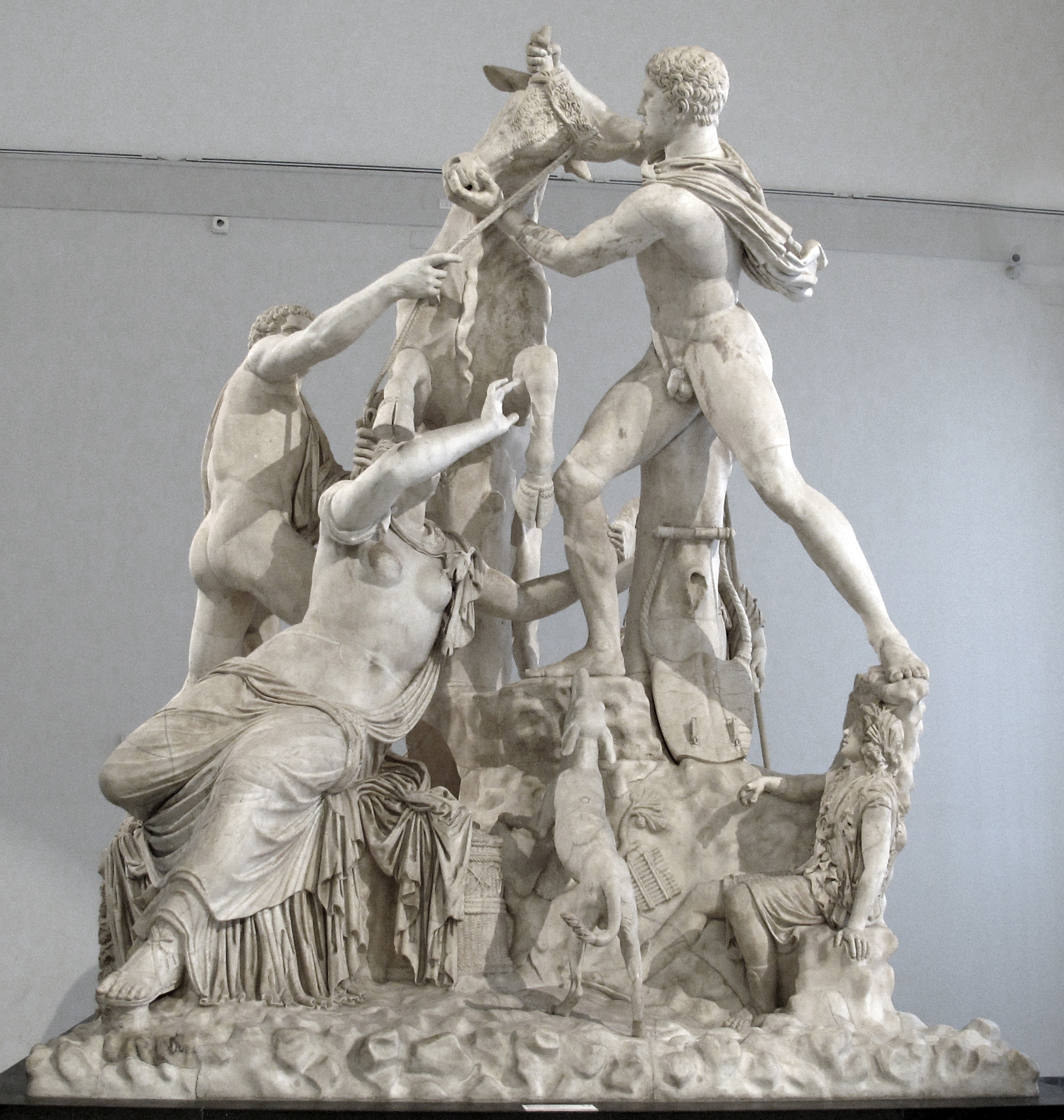
Farnese Bull (130 BC), by Apollonius and Tauriscus of Tralles, National Archaeological Museum of Naples.

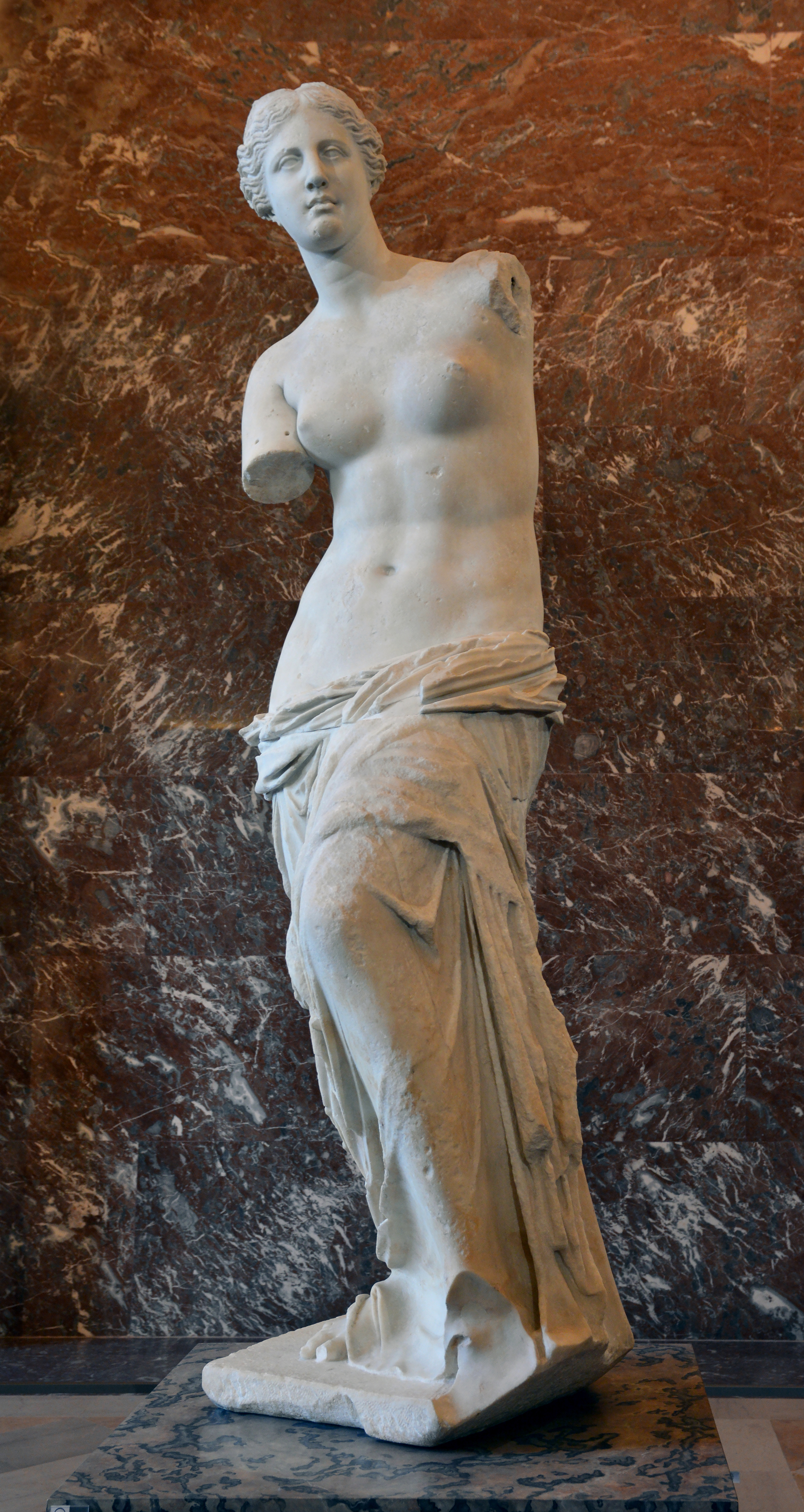
Venus de Milo (130–100 BC), Louvre Museum, Paris.

=== Rome ===
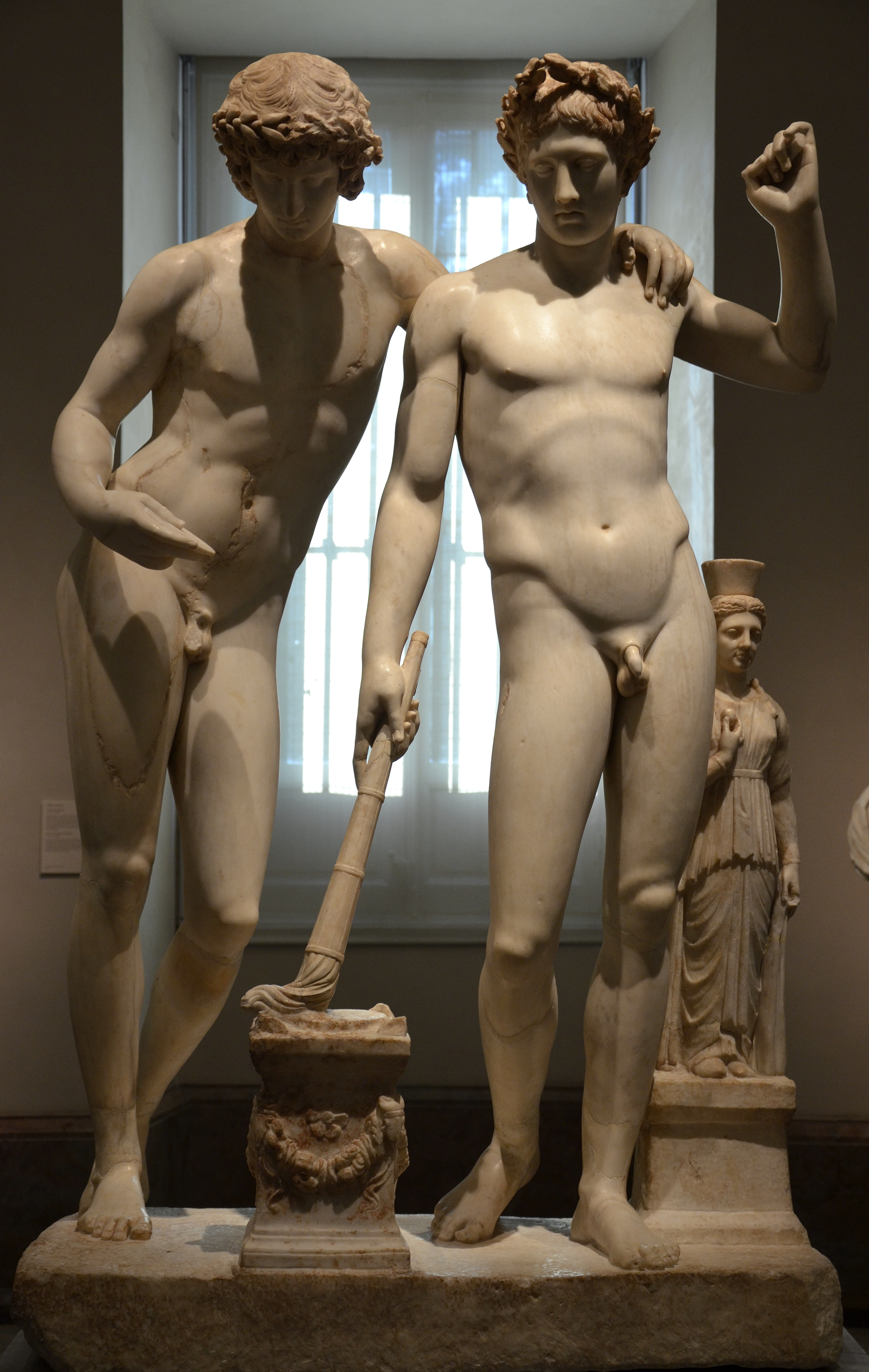
San Ildefonso Group (10 BC), anonymous, Museo del Prado, Madrid.

With a clear precedent in Etruscan art, Roman art was greatly influenced by Greek art. Thanks to the expansion of the Roman Empire, classical Greco-Roman art reached almost every corner of Europe, North Africa, and the Near East, laying the evolutionary foundation for the art developed in these areas in the future. Although the Romans were very advanced in architecture and engineering, they were not very innovative in the plastic arts. Most Roman statues are copies of Greek works or are inspired by them. Many artists from the Hellenistic world moved to work in Rome, keeping alive the spirit of Greek art. Roman historians despised works of art produced after the classical Greek period, going so far as to claim that after this Greek golden age "art stopped".

The first productions in sculpture were the work of Greek artists who settled in Rome, among them: Apollonius of Athens, author of the Belvedere Torso (50 BC); Cleomenes, author of the Venus de' Medici (1st century BC); and Pasiteles, author of the Boy with Thorn. Stephanos, a disciple of Pasiteles, was the author of the Athlete of Albani (50 BC), a figure that had an enormous success, a fact that is corroborated because 18 copies have reached us, and that originated a variant with another figure, creating a group sometimes identified with Mercury and Vulcan, and others with Orestes and Pylades, of which a copy, called Group of San Ildefonso (10 BC), is preserved in the Prado, where the two figures are reminiscent of Polyclitus' Doriphorus and Praxiteles' Apollo Saurochthonus. Other anonymous works stylistically related to Hellenistic Greek art are the Boxer at Rest from the Museo delle Terme in Rome (100–50 BC) and the Hellenistic Prince from the same museum (100–50 BC).

As for the Roman production itself, while maintaining Greek influence, the statues of deified Roman emperors are characteristic: naked, like the Greek gods, they show a greater study of the natural in their portraits. In a few works we can perceive some stylistic stamp differentiated from the Greek ones, as in the Venus of Cyrene (Museo delle Terme, Rome), which shows a greater anatomical naturalism than the Greek figures, while maintaining the elegance and sensuality of the Greek female nude. An original thematic innovation was that of the Three Graces, of which there are several copies (Siena, Louvre), almost all datable to the first century. It is an iconographic theme that comes from the group of charites (divinities of beauty) that accompanied Aphrodite, generally represented with three sisters (Euphrosine, Thalia and Aglaea), holding each other by the arms and arranged two of them frontally and the one in the center turned backwards. This theme was very successful during the Renaissance and Baroque periods.

In imperial times, the interest in the nude declined, in parallel with the idealizing concept of sculpture, gaining greater relevance, realism, and a greater focus on detail, even the ugliest and most unpleasant, a style that reached its greatest crystallization in the portrait. Even so, magnificent pieces were produced, such as the statues of Mars and Mercury that decorate the Hadrian's Villa (125), or the Apotheosis of Antoninus and Faustina that appears on the base of the Column of Antoninus—currently in the Vatican Museum—(161), or even the Dioscuri of Montecavallo, of the Baths of Constantine, in the Piazza del Quirinale in Rome (330).

Roman painting is known mainly from the many examples found in the excavations at Pompeii and Herculaneum. Although mostly decorative, these paintings vary greatly in style, and their subjects include mythological scenes as well as everyday ones such as parties, dances and circus shows. Nudity is frequent in these scenes, and erotic subjects are often depicted openly, as an ordinary part of life. Paintings with nude figures include The Three Graces, Aphrodite Anadyomene, Invocation to Priapus, Cassandra abducted by Ajax, The Dancing Faun, Bacchante surprised by a satyr, The rape of the nymph Iphtima, Hercules recognizing his son Telephus in Arcadia, The centaur Chiron instructing the young Achilles, Perseus freeing Andromeda and The Aldobrandini Wedding.

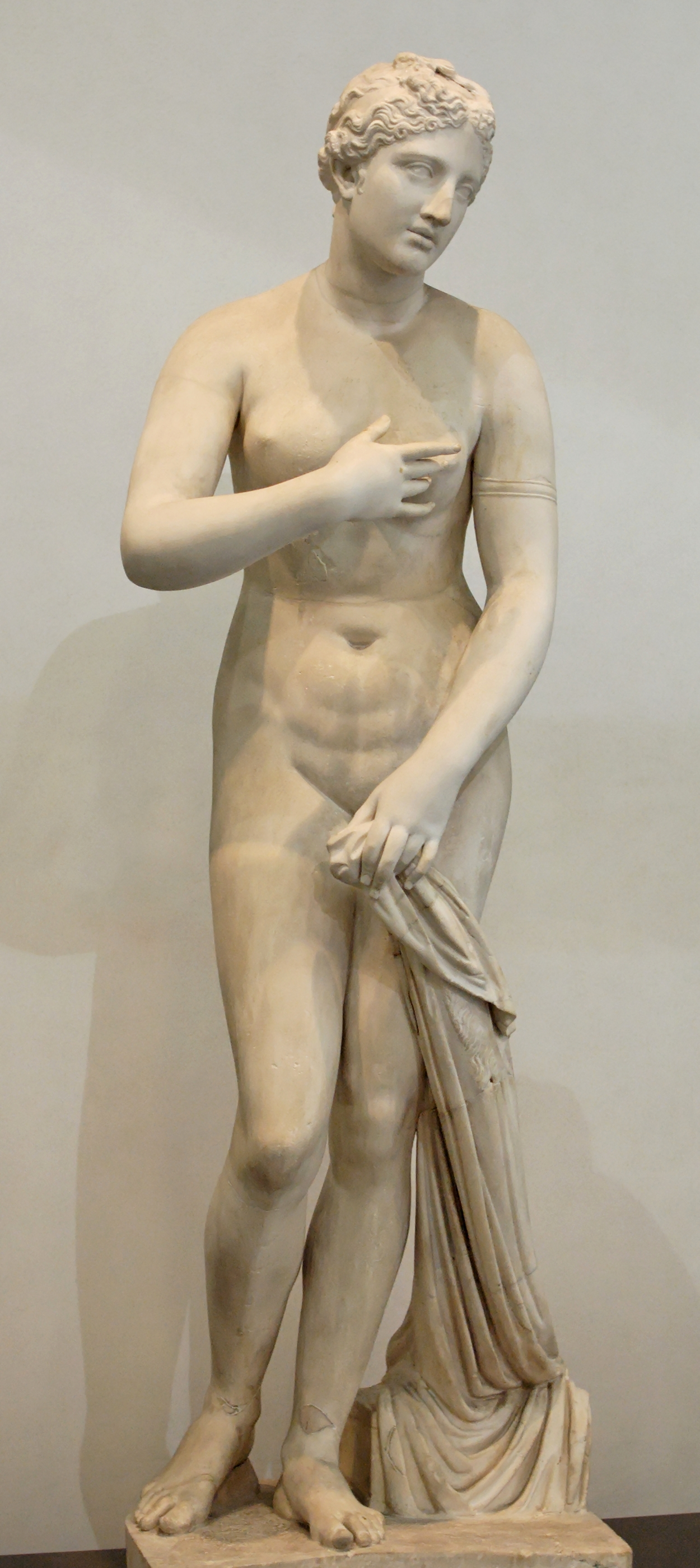
Aphrodite of Menophantos (1st century BC), Museo Nazionale Romano.

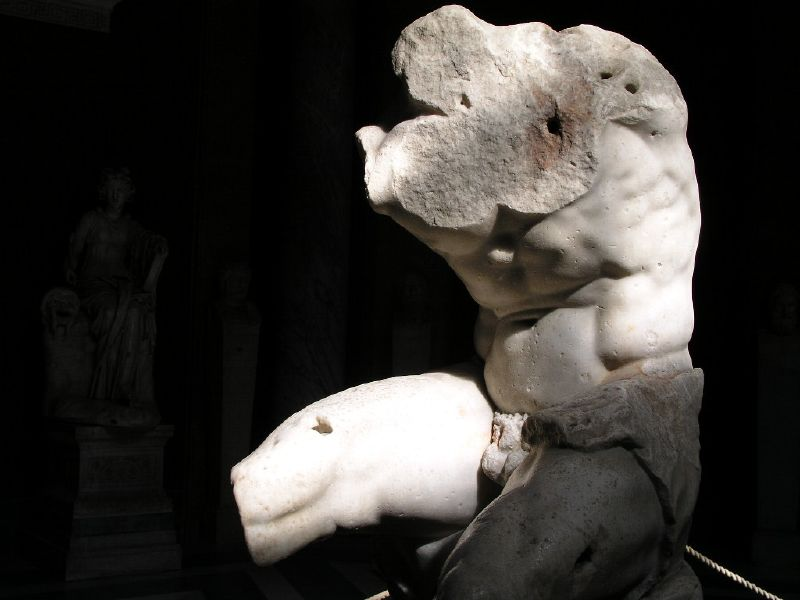
Belvedere Torso (1st century BC), by Apollonius of Athens, Pio-Clementine Museum, Vatican.

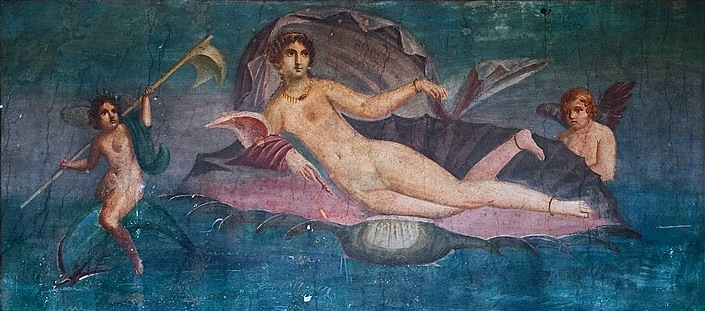
Mural of Pompeii (House of Venus), of Venus Anadyomene (1st century). Copy of a Greek original, believed to be a portrait of Campaspe, concubine of Alexander the Great.

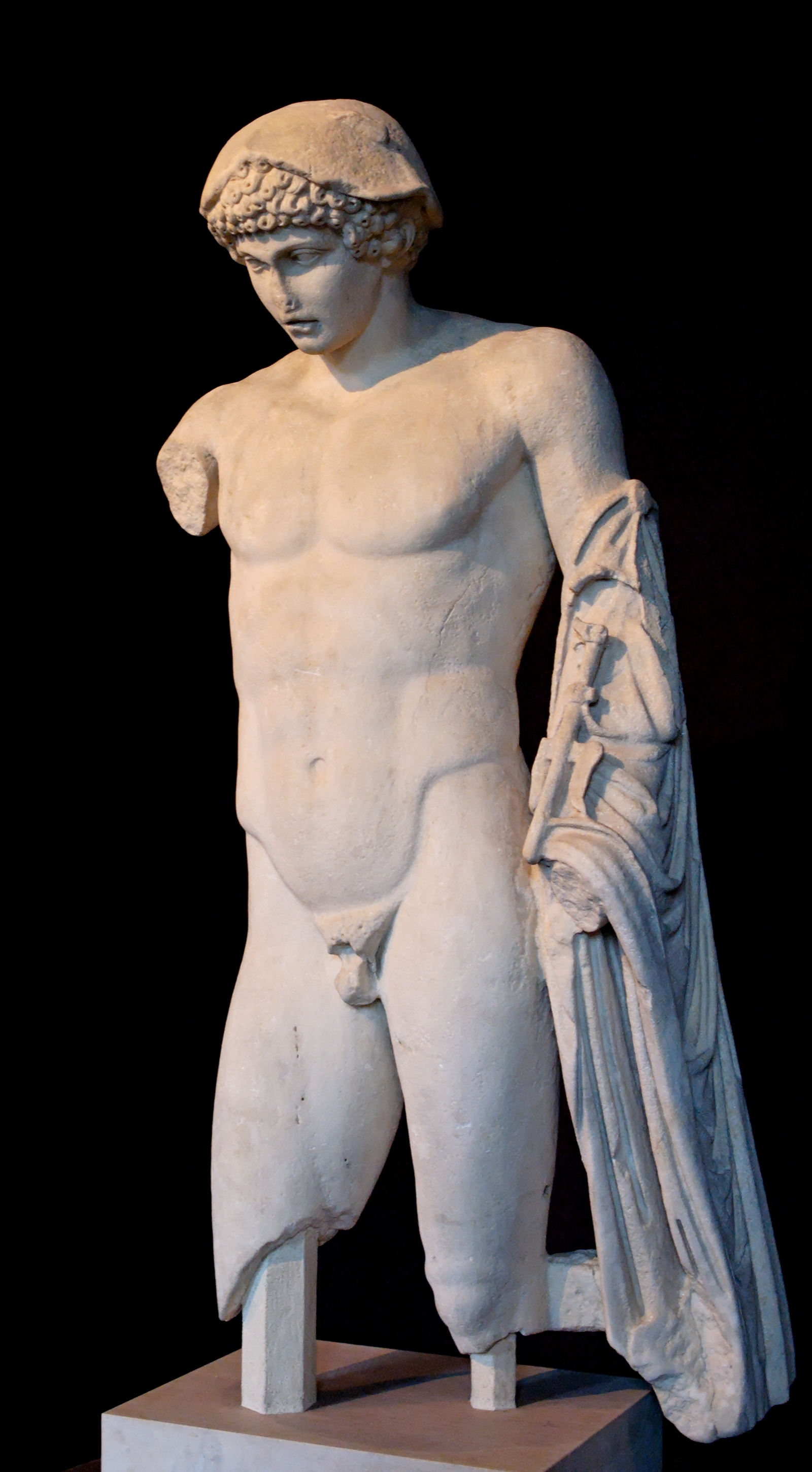
Hermes Ludovisi (1st century), copy of a 5th century BC original attributed to Phidias, Museo Nazionale Romano.

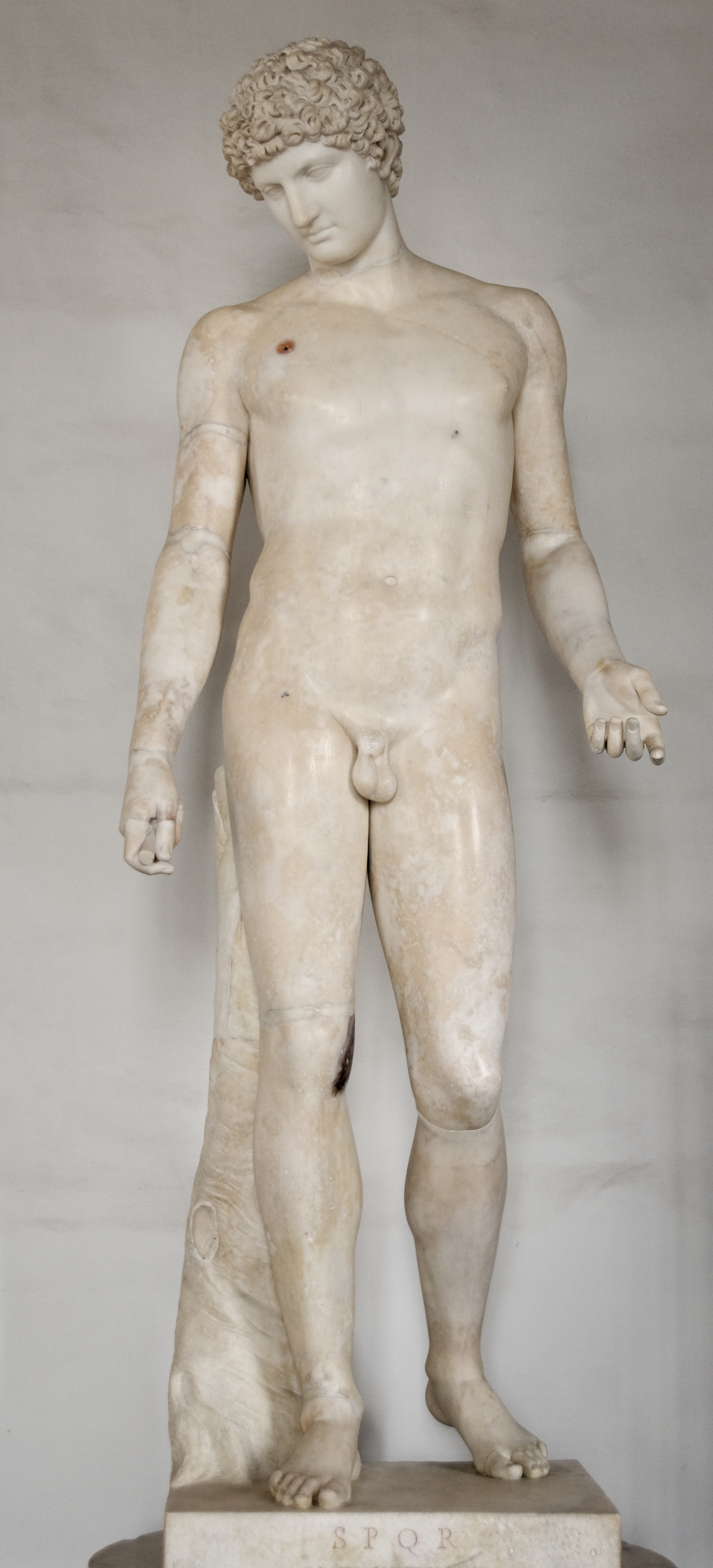
Capitoline Antinous (2nd century), Hall of the Gladiator of the Capitoline Museums.

== Medieval art ==
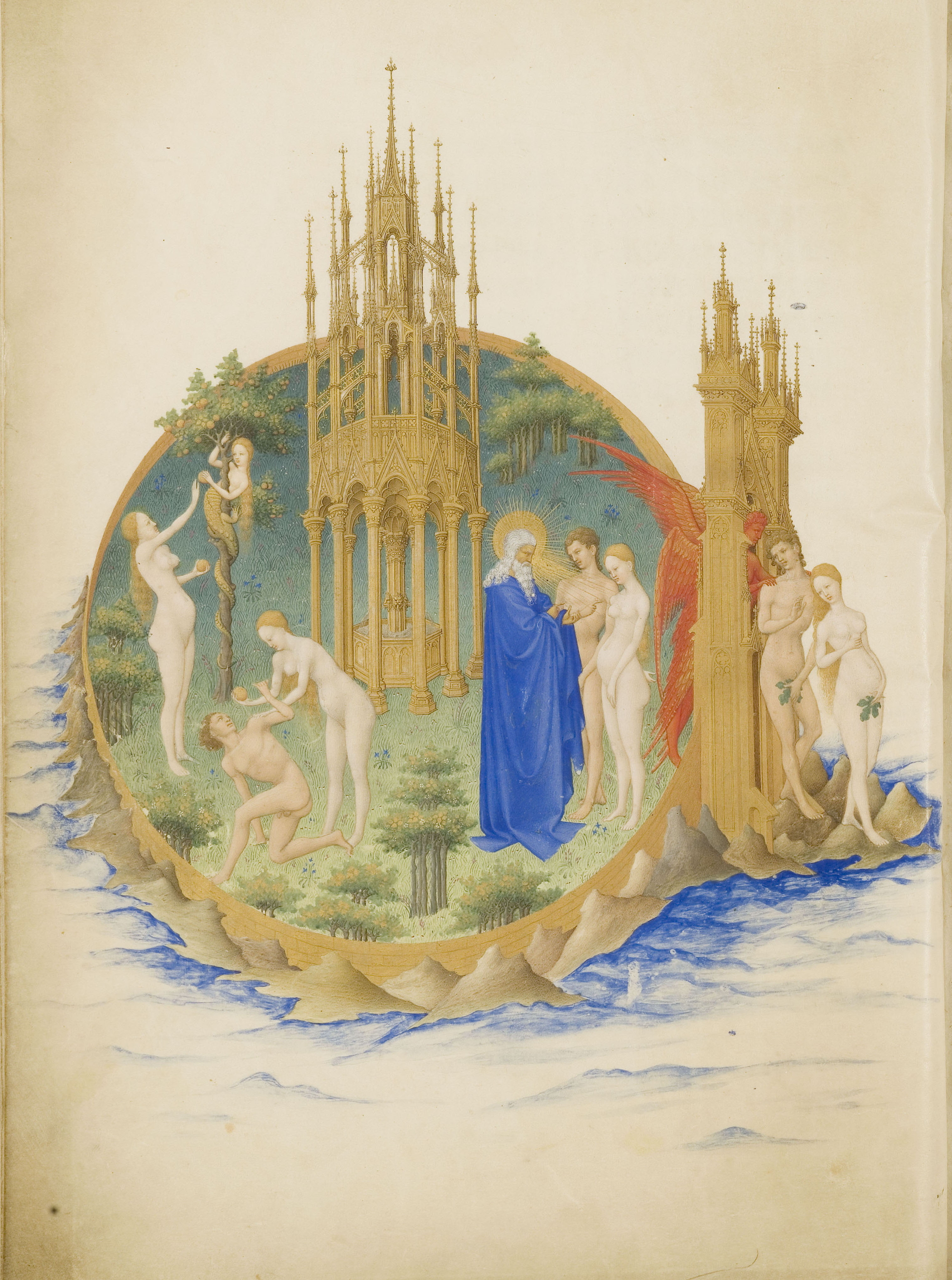
The Fall and the Expulsion from Paradise, from The Very Rich Hours of the Duke of Berry (1416), Limbourg brothers, Musée Condé, Chantilly.

The fall of the Western Roman Empire marked the beginning of the Middle Ages in Europe, a period of certain political and social decadence, as the fragmentation of the empire into small states and the social domination of the new military aristocracy meant the feudalization of all the territories previously administered by the imperial bureaucracy. Classical art was reinterpreted by the new dominant cultures of Germanic origin, while the new religion, Christianity, impregnated most of the medieval artistic production. Medieval art went through several phases, from Paleochristian art, through pre-Romanesque, to Romanesque and Gothic, including Byzantine and Germanic art.

In the Middle Ages, moral theology distinguished four types of nudity: nuditas naturalis, the natural state of the human being; nuditas temporalis, an artificial state imposed by transience, generally linked to poverty; nuditas virtualis, as a symbol of virtue and innocence; and nuditas criminalis, linked to lust and vanity. Another frequent element of nudity in medieval art—especially in the Apocalypses of the Beatus—was the representation of the dead, as a symbol of the stripping of everything earthly.

Christian theology divided the human being into a perishable body and an immortal soul, the latter being the only one considered precious to be preserved. With the disappearance of the pagan religions, most iconographic content depicting the nude was lost, limited to only a few passages in the Holy Scriptures that justified it. In the few cases of representation of the nude, there are angular and deformed figures, far from the harmonious balance of the classical nude, when they are not deliberately ugly and battered forms, as a sign of the contempt that was felt for the body, which was considered a simple appendage of the soul. In the few representations of female nudes—generally figures of Eve—they are figures with bulging bellies, narrow shoulders and straight legs, although the face is usually worked in a personalized way, which was not the case in antiquity.

The human figure was subjected to a process of stylization, in which the naturalistic description was lost to emphasize the transcendent character and the symbolic language of the Christian religion, in parallel to the loss of perspective and the geometrization of space, resulting in a type of representation where the symbolic content, the message inherent in the image, is more important than the description of reality. The Christian religion, influenced by the Platonic idea of the body as a prison for the soul, lost interest in the study of naturalistic anatomical forms, focusing the representation of the human being on expressiveness.

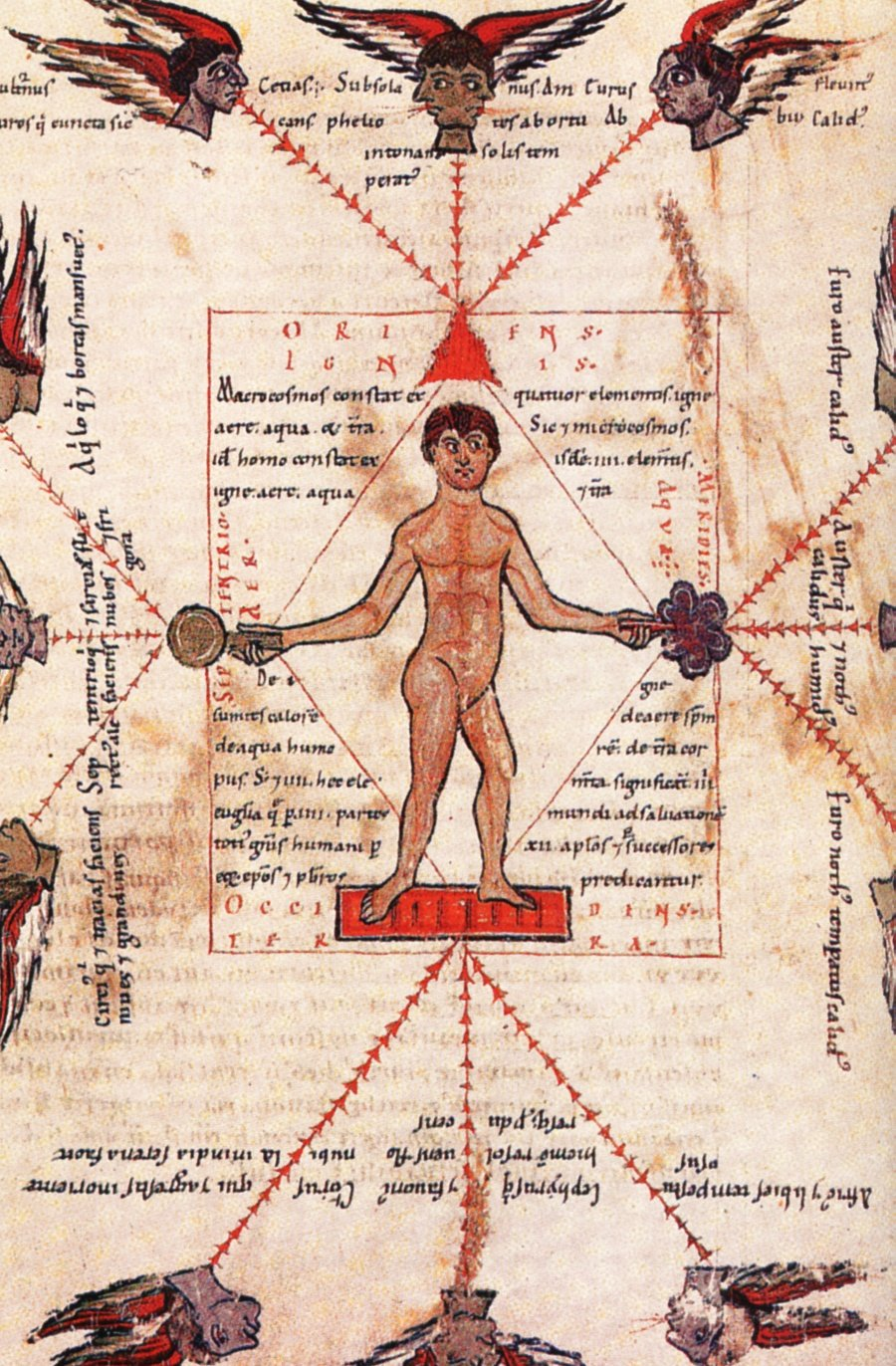
Representation of homo quadratus: winds, elements, temperaments, miniature from the Astronomical Manuscript, Bavaria, 12th century.

Although the study of proportion in the human body was lost during the Middle Ages, the human body was the object of a cosmogonic symbolism with mathematical and aesthetic applications: the homo quadratus. Starting from the Platonic corpus, medieval culture considered the world as a great animal—and, therefore, as a human being—while man was conceived as a world, a microcosm within the great cosmos of Creation. This theory related the symbolism of the number four to nature, which in turn was applied to art: there are four cardinal points, four seasons, four phases of the moon, four main winds; and four is the number of man, a theory that goes back to Vitruvius and his conception of man as an ideal square, with the width of his outstretched arms corresponding to his height.

In its beginnings, Christianity—still under a strong Jewish influence—had forbidden not only the nude, but almost any image of a human figure, since it was a transgression of the second commandment, and condemned pagan idols as the abode of demons. The fact that many pagan gods were represented in painting and sculpture in human form, and in many occasions naked, made the primitive Christians identify the nude with pagan idolatry, if not they saw directly a diabolic link. However, the end of paganism and the assimilation of Neoplatonic philosophy by Christian morality led to the acceptance of the body as a receptacle of the spirit, and nudity as a degraded state of the human being, but natural and acceptable. Even so, medieval art completely lost the concept of bodily beauty inherent in classical art. When it was represented—in the biblical passages that required it, such as Adam and Eve—they were deformed bodies, reduced to basic lines, with minimized sexual attributes, unattractive bodies, devoid of aesthetic qualities. The Gothic period was a timid attempt to remake the human figure, more elaborate and based on more naturalistic premises, but under a certain conventionalism that subjected the forms to a rigidity and a geometrizing structure that subordinated the body to the symbolic aspect of the image, always under the premises of Christian iconography.

The few representations of the nude in medieval art were limited to biblical passages that justified it, such as Adam and Eve in Paradise or the martyrdom and crucifixion of Jesus Christ. The image of Jesus on the cross had two main iconographic transcriptions: that of Christ undressed, called "of Antioch", and that of the Redeemer with a tunic, called "of Jerusalem". Despite the puritanical and anti-nudity character of early Christianity, the naked version triumphed and was accepted as the canonical version of the theme, especially from the Carolingian period. The suffering of Christ on the cross has always been a theme of great drama, so that in a way linked to the Hellenistic pathos, with images where the nude is a vehicle for an intense expression of suffering, so that the anatomy is shown deformed, unstructured, and subjected to the emotional expression of pain. A typical posture is that of Jesus with his head fallen to one side and the body inclined to compensate the position of the body, first seen in the prayer book of Charles the Bald and in the Cross of Gero in the Cologne Cathedral (10th century), and which would later include some small modification, with the body more curved and the knees bent, as in the painted crosses of Cimabue. In northern Europe, however, an even more dramatic image of the crucifixion was imposed, where the anguish reaches authentic levels of paroxysm, as in the Isenheim Altarpiece by Matthias Grünewald.

Paleo-Christian art transformed numerous classical motifs into Christian scenes: thus, the ancient Hermes Moschophorus became the image of Jesus as the Good Shepherd, and Orpheus became Christ the benefactor. From the biblical repertoire, apart from Adam and Eve, the prophet Daniel was often depicted naked among the lions, an image preserved in a mural painting in the Giordano Cemetery in Rome (4th century), and in a sarcophagus in the Archbasilica of St. John Lateran.

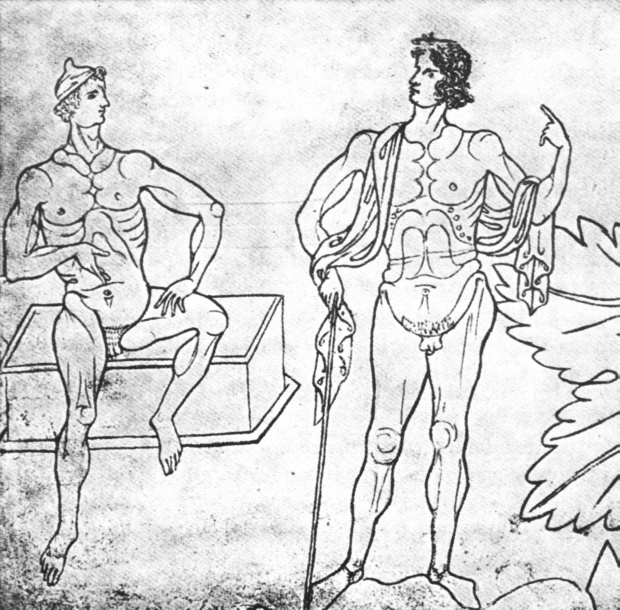
Drawing of ancient figures, from the Livre de portraiture (13th century), by Villard de Honnecourt, Bibliothèque nationale de France, copy of Gallo-Roman bronzes representing Dionysus and Hermes.

In Romanesque art, the few nude representations—generally limited to the Genesis passages about Adam and Eve—were of basic lines, where the figure of the woman was barely distinguished from that of the man by the breasts, reduced to two shapeless protuberances. They were crude and schematic figures, preferably showing an attitude of shame, covering their private parts with decorum. This is shown in examples such as the reliefs of the Creation, the Fall and the Expulsion of the bronze doors of the Hildesheim Cathedral (c. 1010), in the Adam and Eve of the facade of the Modena Cathedral, work of Wiligelmus (c. 1105), or in the Creation of Adam and Adam and Eve in the Paradise of the Master of Maderuelo (Museo del Prado). In other cases, total or partial nudes can be seen in scenes of martyrdom of saints, such as that of Saint Gabin and Saint Cyprian in Saint-Savin-sur-Gartempe (Poitou). The same iconographic themes, perhaps treated with greater freedom, can be seen in the illustrated miniature, such as the Adam and Eve from the Virgilian Codex (El Escorial Monastery), or The Baptism of Christ from the Vyšehrad Gospel Book (1085, University of Prague).

In Gothic art, the nude began to take shape primarily in the Germanic environment at the beginning of the 13th century. The first independent, life-size figures representing a nude are the Adam and Eve of the Bamberg Cathedral (c. 1235), which still look like two columns of rigid, hieratic forms, but are treated with a certain air of nobility. At this time, the iconographic repertoire was expanded a bit, especially with the incorporation of the Last Judgment, coming from chapters 24 and 25 of St. Matthew—until then, most of the scenes of the biblical story represented in the cathedral reliefs ended with the Apocalypse. The scene of the resurrection of the flesh depicted the bodies as naked, whereas reborn souls should be represented according to the parameters of perfect beauty. Hence, the artists looked again at the works of classical Greco-Roman art, emerging treatises such as the Speculum of Vincent de Beauvais, which contained instructions for artists based on ancient classical treatises. Studies of the natural began again, and data indicate that some artists went to public baths to study the body in more detail, as evidenced in the Last Judgment of the Bourges Cathedral, with more naturalistic forms, reminiscent of the figures on the sarcophagi of antiquity. In this work, the woman in the center has more feminine forms, and her contrapposto posture has a certain Polyletian air. However, her forms are stylized and not very sensual, with small, separated breasts, a flat belly, and reduced hips.

Little by little, the Gothic nude was gaining in naturalness and anatomical precision, while the thematic repertoire was expanding. The use of the nude figure in all areas of art was spreading, not only in sculpture and miniatures, but also in reredos, stained glass, choir stalls, gold and silver work, etc. Some of the new themes represented were St. Jerome and other ascetics, stripped of everything material by virtue of their renunciation of earthly goods, or female figures such as Mary Magdalene and Mary of Egypt. Sometimes the serpent that tempted Eve in Paradise or the dragon was defeated by St. George is also represented in naked human form. Greater sensuality was given to certain female figures of the Old Testament, such as Bathsheba, Susanna, Judith, Delilah and Salome. Sometimes the Virgin Mary was even allowed to show a breast by virtue of nursing the infant Jesus, as in Jean Fouquet's The Virgin and Child (1450, also called Madonna of the Red Angels).

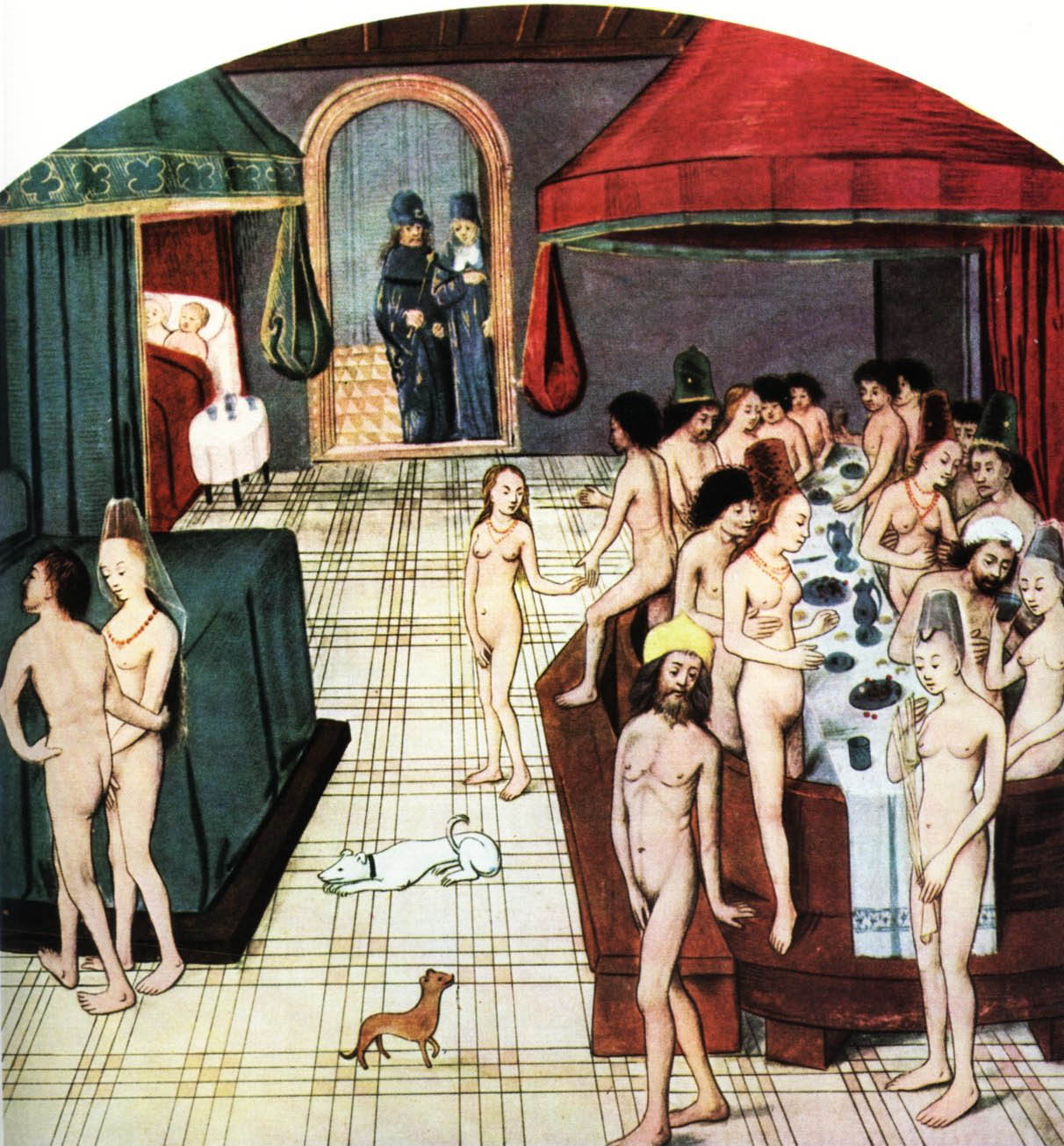
Scene in a bathhouse, 15th-century miniature.

At the beginning of the 14th century, the façade of the Orvieto Cathedral, the work of Lorenzo Maitani, where he deployed a large series of nudes that seems to show a personal interest of the artist in the subject, since he chose all the themes that justify it: the Creation, the Fall of Man, the Last Judgment. His Eve rising from Adam's side is undoubtedly inspired by the ancient sarcophagi of nereids, and shows for the first time a certain idealism, a conception of the body as a receptacle of the soul and, as such, worthy of consideration. The Last Judgment, on the other hand, seems to be of Nordic inspiration, in a variegated scene reminiscent of battle sarcophagi or ancient scenes of dying Gauls.

In the 15th century, the nude had a greater diffusion, framed in the fashionable current of the time, the so-called "international Gothic", which emerged between France, Burgundy, and the Netherlands around the year 1400. One of its first exponents was The Very Rich Hours of the Duke of Berry by the Limbourg brothers (1416), where a scene from The Fall and the Expulsion from Paradise shows the evolution of Eve from the naturalness of life in Eden to the shame of sin and the expulsion from Paradise, where she takes the form of a Venus pudica that is covered with a fig leaf. Her elongated, bulbous form, with small breasts and a bulging belly, became the prototype of the Gothic female nude, which would last for two hundred years. This can be seen in figures such as the Eve of the Ghent Altarpiece by Jan van Eyck, in the Adam and Eve by Hugo van der Goes and in that by Rogier van der Weyden, or in other female figures such as the Vanity by Hans Memling or the Judith by Conrad Meit, where the modest medieval attitude that related the nude as something shameful is giving way to more sensual, more provocative, more carnally human figures. In Spain, the first timid attempts at nudes emerged, far from any sensuality, serious, contained, such as the Descent of Christ into Limbo by Bartolomé Bermejo, the Martyrdom of Saint Catherine by Fernando Gallego, the figure of Saint Tecla in the High Altarpiece of the Tarragona Cathedral, by Pere Johan (1429), or The Slaughter of Saint Cucufate (1504–1507), by Ayne Bru.

The more or less naturalistic nude began to appear timidly in pre-Renaissance Italy, generally in the form of allegories, such as the image of Daniel as Fortitude on the pulpit in the Pisa Baptistery, by Nicola Pisano 1260, based on a Roman Hercules, which slightly evokes a polychletian athlete; or the figure of Temperance in a pulpit of Pisa Cathedral (1300–1310), by Giovanni Pisano, in the form of a Venus in a modest form, covering her private parts with her arms. It is also perceived in Giotto's work, especially in his Last Judgment in the Scrovegni Chapel in Padua.

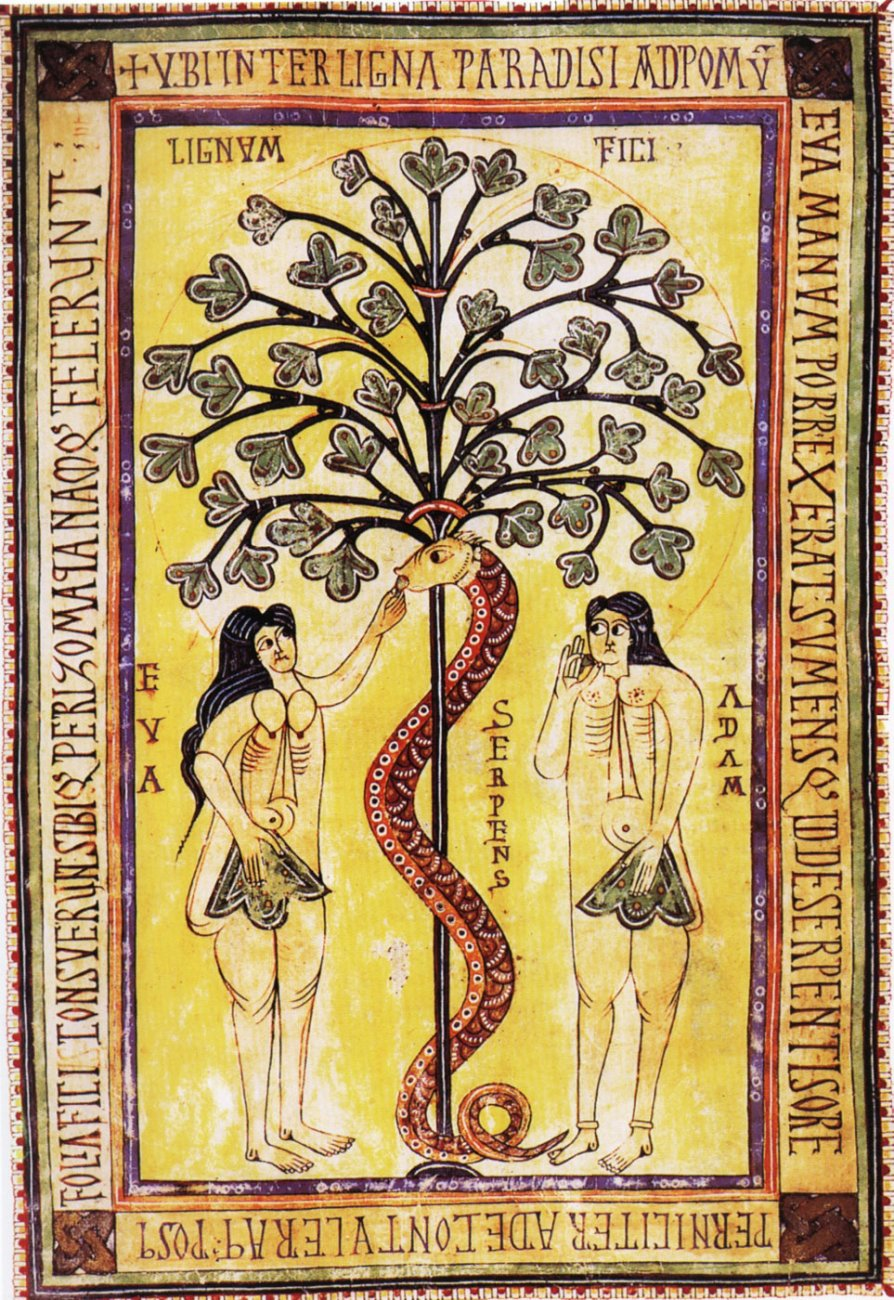
Adam and Eve and the Tree of Good and Evil, miniature from the Codex Aemilianensis (994), Real Biblioteca del Monasterio de San Lorenzo de El Escorial.

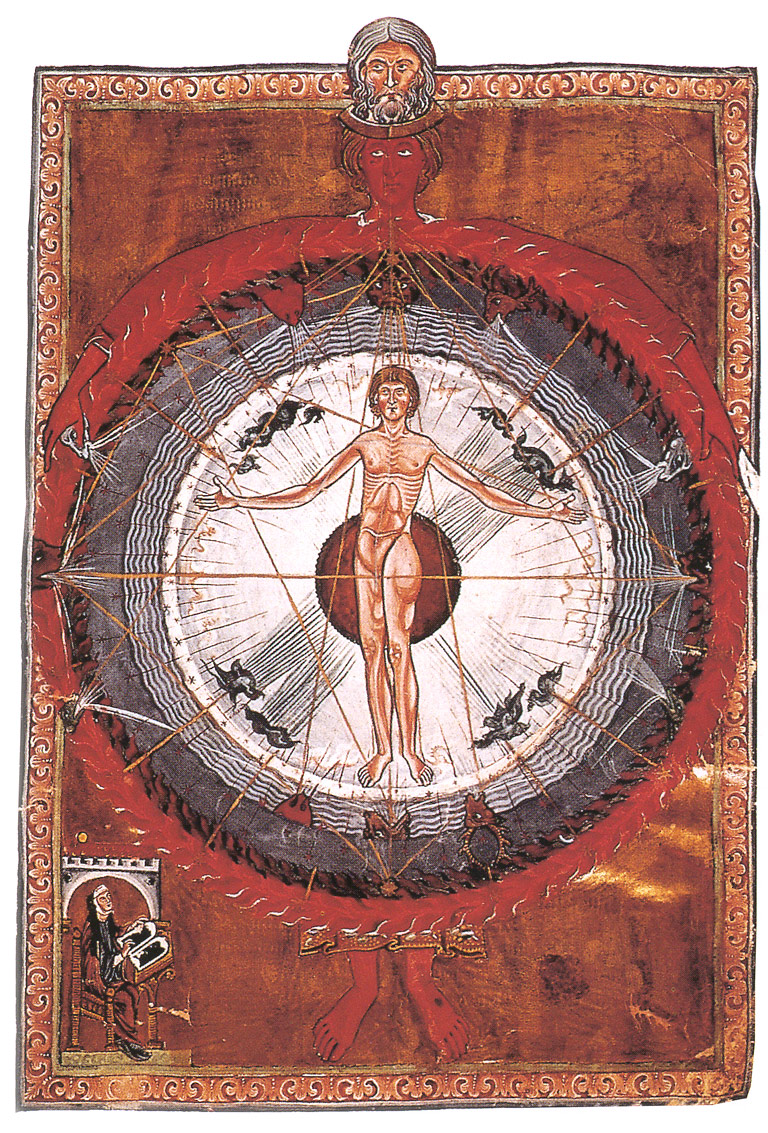
The Creation with the Universe and the Cosmic Man, miniature of the Liber Divinorum Operum (1230), by Hildegard of Bingen, Biblioteca Stadale di Lucca.

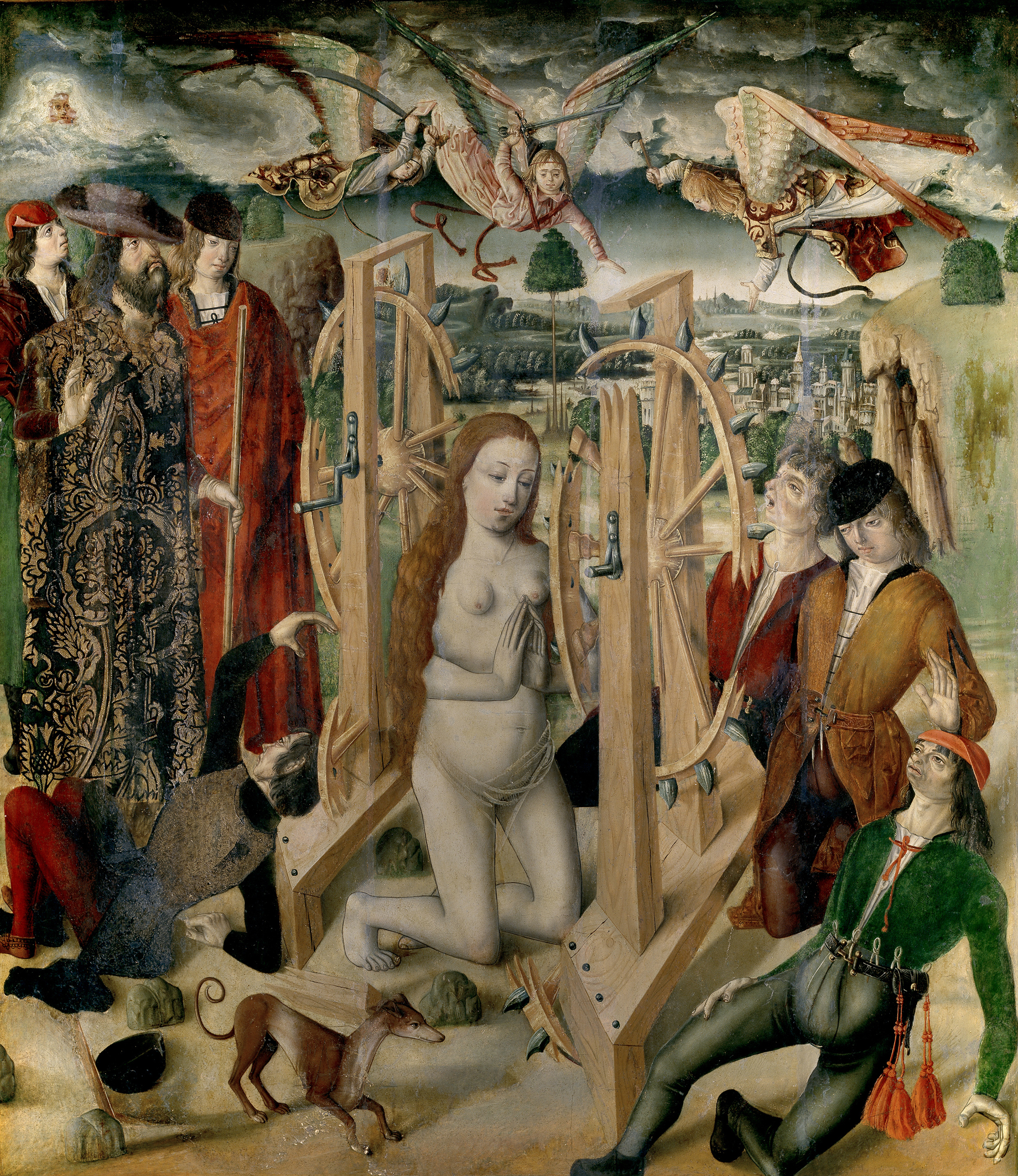
Martyrdom of Saint Catherine (second half of the 15th century), circle of Fernando Gallego, Museo del Prado, Madrid.

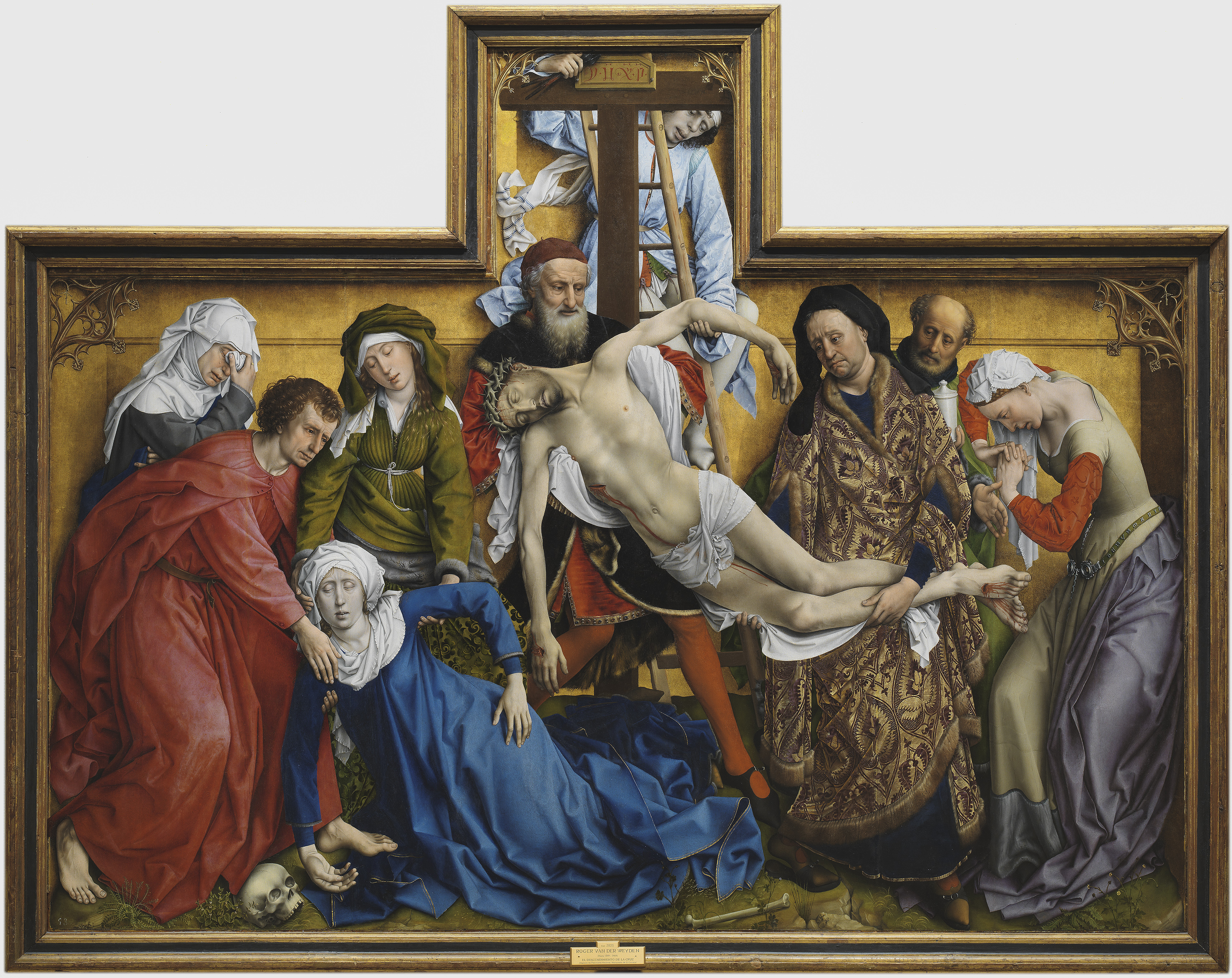
The Descent from the Cross (1436), by Rogier van der Weyden, Museo del Prado, Madrid.

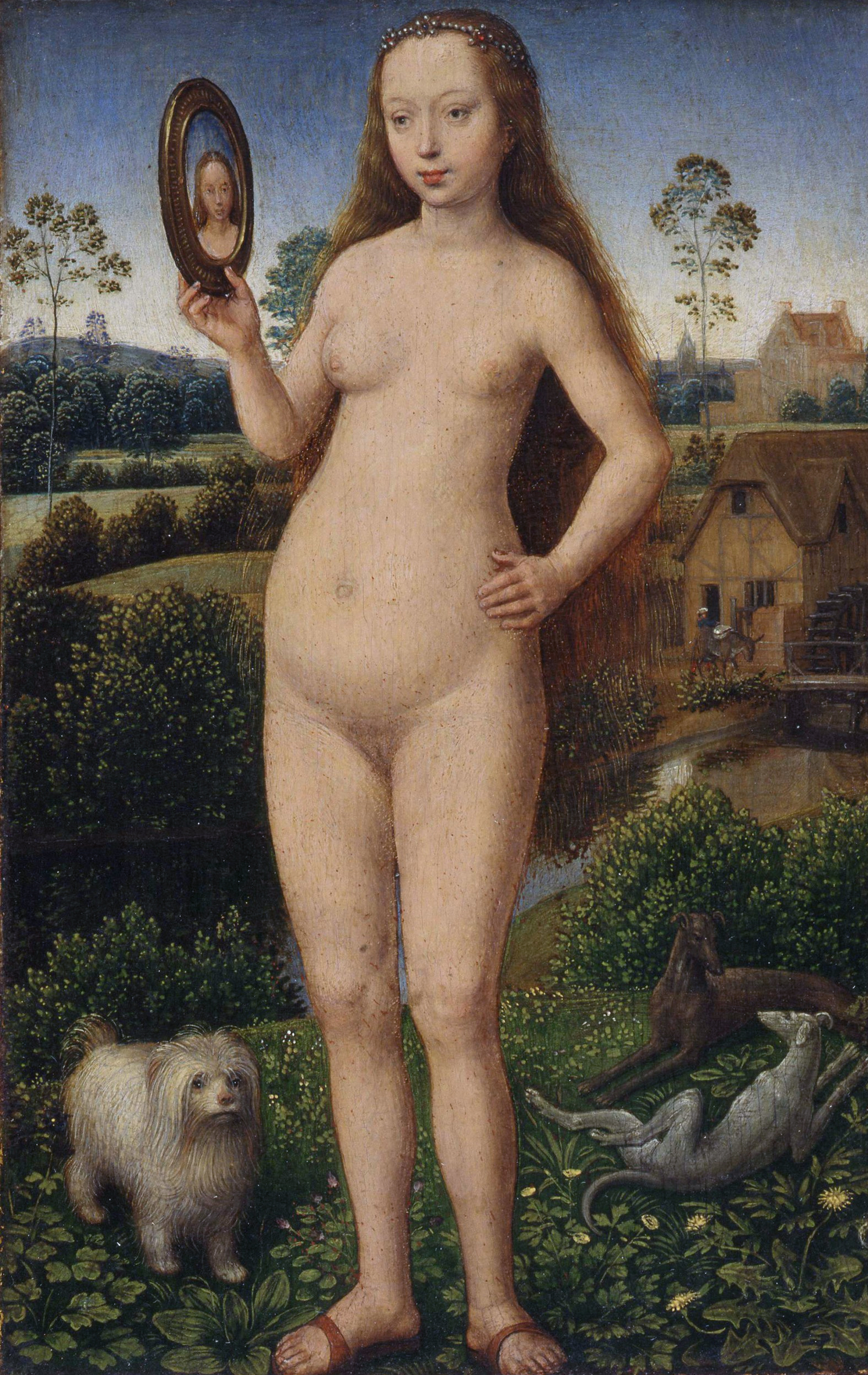
Vanity (1485), by Hans Memling, Museum of Fine Arts of Strasbourg.

== Art of the Early Modern Age ==
The Birth of Venus (1485), by Sandro Botticelli, Uffizi, Florence.

The art of the Early Modern Age—not to be confused with modern art, which is often used as a synonym for contemporary art— (Note: The term "modern art" comes from the concept of "modernity", a philosophical-cultural theory that postulates the current validity of a historical period marked culturally by the Enlightenment, politically by the French Revolution and economically by the Industrial Revolution, and which would be the social root of the Late modern period. The modern project is characterized by the end of determinism and the supremacy of religion, replaced by reason and science, objectivism and individualism, confidence in technology and progress, and confidence in human capabilities. This "modern era" has reached the present day, being fully in force according to some writers. In contrast, others defend that it is currently an outdated phase in the evolution of humanity, speaking of "postmodernity" as the successor period of this modern project (Bozal, Valeriano (1993). "Modernos y postmodernos" (in Spanish). Madrid: Historia 16: 8–16.)) developed between the 15th and 18th centuries. The Early Modern Age brought radical political, economic, social and cultural changes: the consolidation of centralized states meant the establishment of absolutism; the new geographical discoveries—especially the American continent—opened an era of territorial and commercial expansion, marking the beginning of colonialism; the invention of the printing press led to a greater diffusion of culture, which was opened to all types of public; religion lost the preponderance it had in medieval times, which was helped by the rise of Protestantism; at the same time, humanism emerged as a new cultural trend, giving way to a more scientific conception of man and the universe.

=== Renaissance ===
Allegory of Beauty, by Cesare Ripa. Beauty is a naked woman with her head hidden among clouds (symbol of the subjective nature of beauty); in her right hand she holds a globe and a compass (beauty as measure and proportion), and in her left hand a fleur-de-lis (beauty as temptress of the soul, like the perfume of a flower).

Emerging in Italy in the 15th century (Quattrocento), it spread throughout the rest of Europe from the end of that century and the beginning of the 16th century. The artists were inspired by classical Greco-Roman art, so it was called the artistic "renaissance" after the medieval obscurantism. Style inspired by nature, new models of representation emerged, such as the use of perspective. Without renouncing religious themes, the representation of the human being and his environment became more relevant, with the appearance of new themes such as mythology or history, or new genres such as landscape or still life, which influenced the revitalization of the nude. Beauty ceased to be symbolic, as in the medieval era, to have a more rational and measured component, based on harmony and proportion.

Renaissance art, in parallel with the anthropocentrism of humanist philosophy, which made the human being the center of the new worldview of the newly inaugurated modern age, relied on the study of anatomy to better articulate representations of the human body. In 1543, De humani corporis fabrica by Andreas Vesalius was published, an anatomical study of the body based on dissections, where along with the text there were multiple illustrative plates of the human body, attributed to Jan van Calcar, which served as a basis for other artists for their images, based increasingly on objective realism. The plates in the book were conceived with artistic criteria, with skeletons and flayed figures appearing in artistic poses or in gesticulating, almost theatrical attitudes.

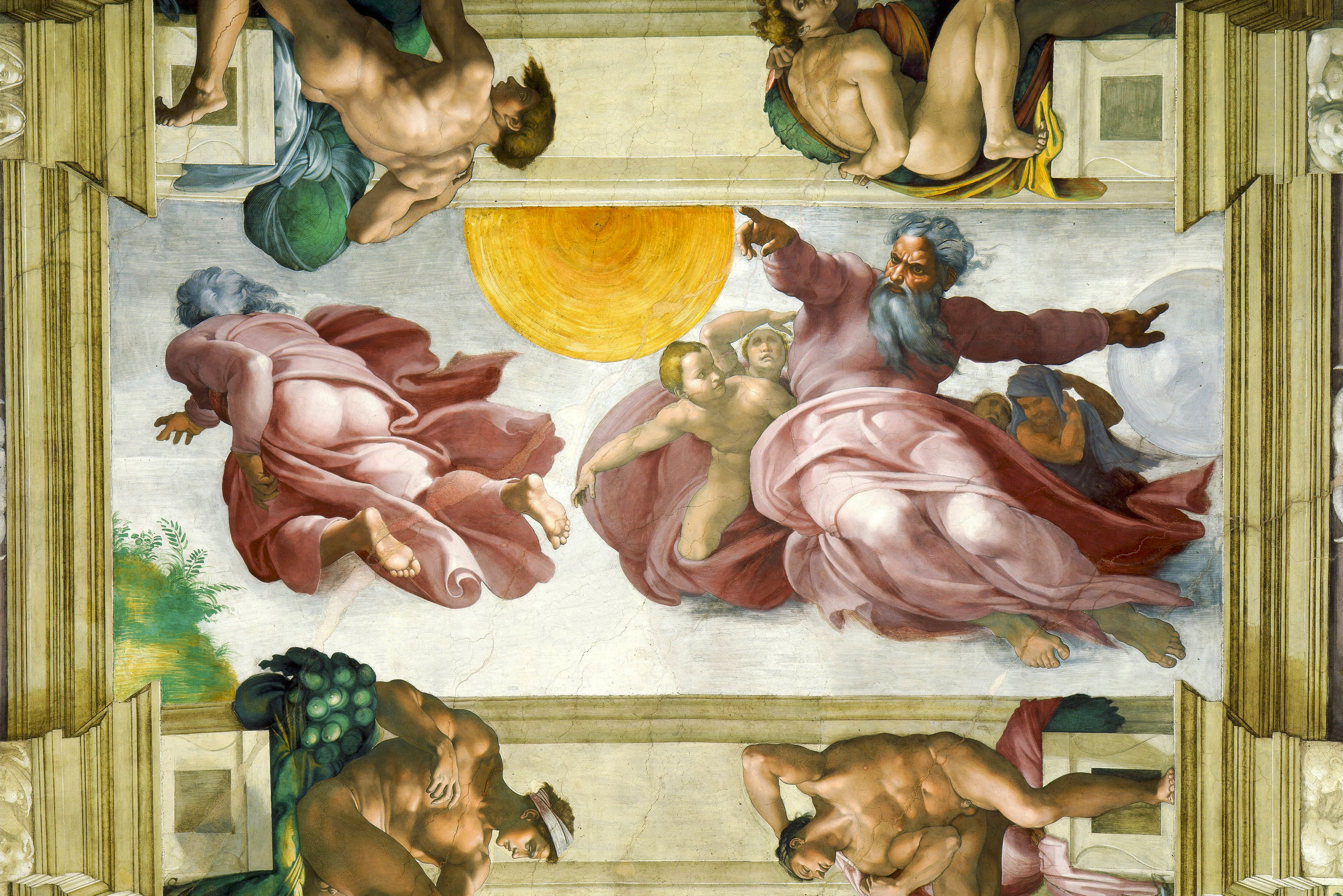
The Creation of the Sun, Moon, and Plants (1511), by Michelangelo, Sistine Chapel, Vatican. It presents a controversial nude of God, referenced in the book of Exodus (Exodus 33:18–23).

Classical Greco-Roman models inspired the Renaissance nude, although with a different function from the one it had in antiquity: if in Greece the male nude exemplified the figure of the hero, in Renaissance Italy the nude has a more aesthetic character, more linked to a new way of understanding the world away from religious precepts, the human being again as the center of the universe. The female nude stood out mainly because of the patronage of nobles and rich merchants, who demonstrated their privileged position in society. Thus, the secularization of the nude was forged, passing from medieval religious themes to profane ones, sometimes with somewhat forced attempts to justify this type of representation outside the religious sphere: Botticelli's main works, Primavera and The Birth of Venus, represent the Neoplatonic concept that Marsilio Ficino extrapolated from the myth of Venus as the ideal of the virtuous woman, where despite her nudity after her birth into adulthood her first reaction is to cover herself, following the ancient concept of the "Venus Pudica".

Renaissance art recovered the classical nude as an exemplification of ideal beauty, both physical and moral. The nude was the perfect pretext for any composition, from the most naturalistic to the most symbolic, the latter expressed through multiple allegories and personifications. At times, the Renaissance representation of the human body was that of nudity for nudity's sake, a kind of art for art's sake that often denaturalized the very subject of the painting, whether religious or mythological. In the Renaissance the nude ceased to be a source of shame and, in contrast, acquired a new heroic or even sacred character (sacra nuditas). According to Louis Réau (Iconography of Christian Art, 1955), "Renaissance artists considered the representation of the human body in its triumphant nudity as the primary object of the plastic arts".

Similarly, the nude was present both in the major arts and in myriad minor arts and objects, from candlesticks to knives and doorknobs. Such an abundance of nude representations was excused by Benvenuto Cellini because "the human body is the most perfect of forms", so it is not surprising that it is frequently depicted. On the other hand, at the iconographic level, although an increasing number of works with mythological themes began to be executed, most of the artistic production continued to be religious, producing a curious symbiosis between the mythical figures of the classical nude and the Christian characters most justified in appearing nude; Thus, we see how the figure of Isaac in Ghiberti's The Sacrifice of Isaac presents the classical typology of The Children of Niobe, how the figure of the recumbent Christ in Donatello's Entombment recalls the classical Meleager, or the posture of Eve in Masaccio's Expulsion from Paradise is that of the Venus Pudica.

During the 15th century, certain forms inherited from Gothic art still survived in Italy, although they gradually gained in naturalism and veracity. This can be seen in the work of artists such as: Masaccio (Expulsion of Adam and Eve from Eden, 1425–1428); Masolino da Panicale (The Temptation of Adam and Eve, 1426–1427); Antonello da Messina (St. Sebastian, 1476; Dead Christ supported by an angel, 1476–1479); and Andrea Mantegna (Calvary, 1458; Bacchanal with Wine Vat, 1470; Lamentation over the Dead Christ, c. 1475–1490; Parnassus, 1497; Venus, Mars and Diana, not dated; Saint Sebastian, (three versions in 1459, 1480, and 1490), etc. The same happened in the sculptural field with Lorenzo Ghiberti, author of the Gates of Paradise of the Baptistery of Florence (1425–1452), with his scenes of The Creation of Adam and Eve, The Original Sin and The Expulsion from Paradise.

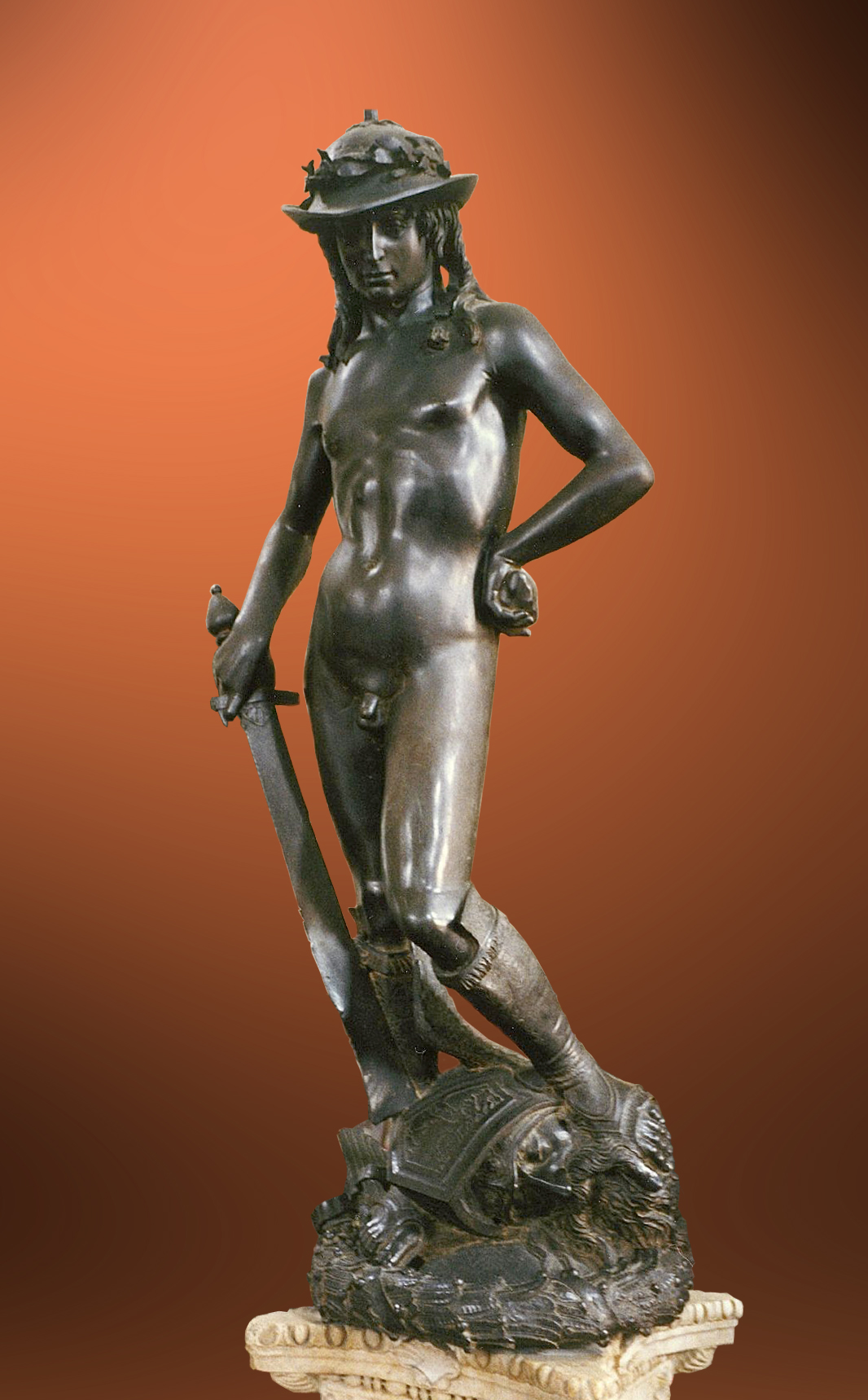
David (c. 1440), by Donatello, Museo Nazionale del Bargello, Florence.

One of the first works that broke with the past and represented a return to the classical canons was Donatello's David (c. 1440), a work of great originality that was ahead of its time, since for the next fifty years there were no works with which it could be compared. However, Donatello's model was not as athletic as the Greek works, presenting the graceful and slender forms of a boy in his teens. Similarly, instead of the serenity of Apollonian beauty, the sensuality of Dionysian beauty is perceived, and the head of Goliath at the feet of the Jewish king recalls that of a satyr that once adorned the base of statues of the Greek god of wine. Donatello also deviated from classical proportions, especially in the torso, where, in contrast to the polyletian cuirasse esthétique, it is the waist that vertebrates the central axis of the body.

After Donatello, the nude became more dynamic, especially in Florence with the work of Antonio Pollaiuolo and Botticelli, and in Umbria with Luca Signorelli, concerned with the representation of movement, energy, and ecstatic feeling. In his paintings of The Labors of Hercules in the Medici Palace (1460), Pollaiuolo recovered the "heroic diagonal" of Greek sculpture, showing great virtuosity in the representation of the nude in action. According to Vasari, his treatment of the nude "is more modern than that of any of the masters who preceded him". Pollaiuolo made profound studies of anatomy, Vasari confessing that he dissected corpses, studying especially the muscles. In this way, he moved away from Greco-Roman classicism, which although based on the naturalism of the forms, these were idealized, far from the anatomical realism introduced by Pollaiuolo, as shown in his Hercules and Antaeus (1470), whose tension when the hero crushes the body of the giant denotes the detail of the anatomical study carried out by the author. With his brother Piero, he painted the Martyrdom of Saint Sebastian (1475), which again shows his anatomical studies, especially in the archer whose face is red from the effort of drawing the bow.

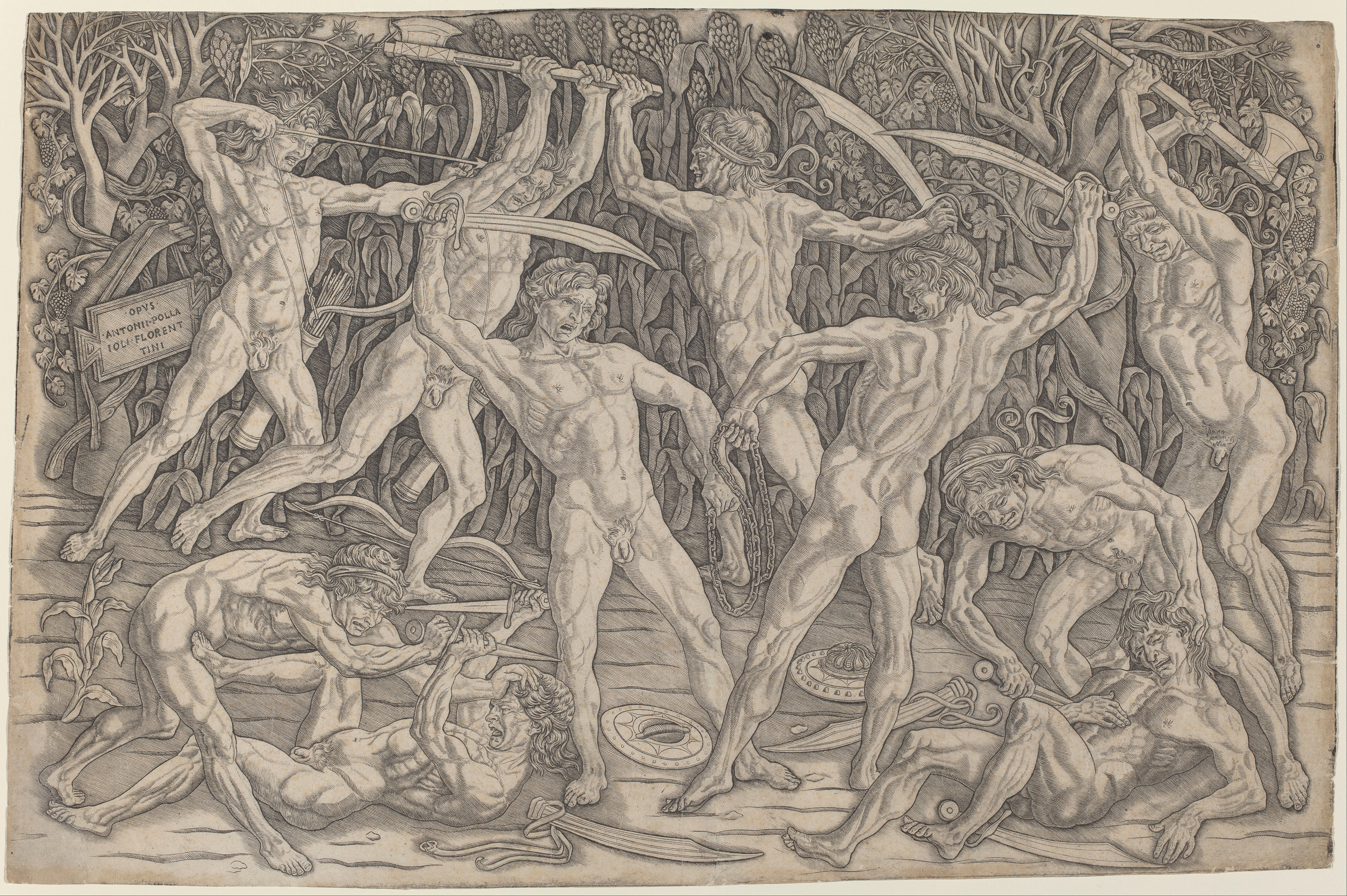
Battle of the Nudes (1470–1480), engraving by Antonio del Pollaiuolo, Rothschild collection.

Luca Signorelli was another exponent of the dynamic, anatomical nude, especially for his angular, broad, and firm shoulders, which denote contained energy, as well as the simplification of certain parts of the body with contrasting volumes—shoulders and buttocks, chest and stomach—which gives his figures a dense plasticity, a certain tactile quality. In his frescoes in the Orvieto Cathedral (1499–1505), he presented muscular figures, of marked contours, with a latent dynamic tension, as in his figures of The Damned Cast into Hell. The tense and dynamic nudes of Pollaiuolo and Signorelli initiated a fashion for "battles of naked men" that would continue from 1480 to 1505, without special iconographic justification, simply for their aestheticism—what in Florence they called the bel corpo ignudo—and that is denoted in works such as the Battle by Bertoldo di Giovanni (1480), the Fighting Men by Raphael or the Battle of the Centaurs (1492) and the Battle of Cascina (1504) by Michelangelo.

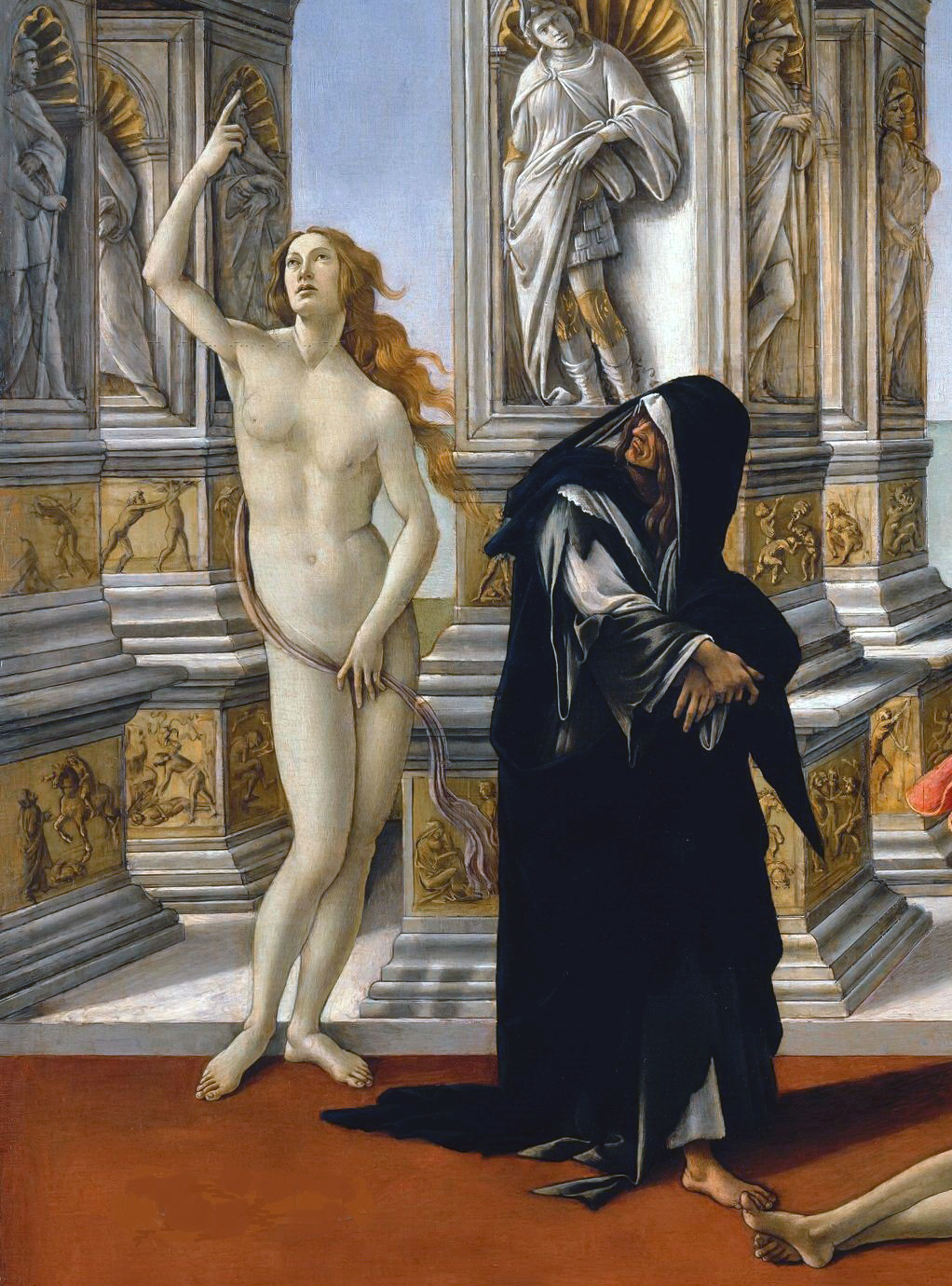
The Truth, detail from The Calumny of Apelles (1490–1495), by Botticelli, Galleria degli Uffizi, Florence.

Botticelli created highly intellectualized nudes, with a strong symbolic charge, related to the Neoplatonic school of Florence, which was mainly responsible for the recovery of the female nude after the medieval moralistic period. Marsilio Ficino, one of the main theorists of the school, recovered the figure of Venus as a model of virtue and mystical exaltation, opposing two figures from Plato's Symposium, the celestial (Venus Coelestis) and the mundane (Venus Naturalis) Venus, symbolizing what is divine and earthly in women. This symbolism was excellently treated by Botticelli in his two main works: Primavera (1481–1482) and The Birth of Venus (1484). For this, he drew inspiration from the few surviving classical works he had at his disposal, including sarcophagi, jewelry, reliefs, ceramics, and drawings. He created an archetype of beauty that would be identified as the classical ideal of beauty since the Renaissance. In Primavera, he revived the genre of the draperie mouillée, with fine, semi-transparent fabrics that allow the contours of the body to be seen, and a sense of classicism drawn from the paintings of Pompeii and Herculaneum and the stuccoes of Prima Porta and Hadrian's Villa. However, Botticelli moved away from the volumetric character of the classical nude, with fragile, slender figures that responded more to the modern concept of the human body, while his faces are more personal and humanized than those of the ideal classical prototypes. In The Birth of Venus, painted after his stay in Rome, where he frescoed the Sistine Chapel, he showed a purer classicism, thanks to his contact with the Roman antiquities present in the city of the popes. Thus, his Venus is already stripped of all clothing and moralistic constraints, definitively abandoning medieval art to enter fully into modernity. The iconographic theme was taken from some verses of the Giostra by Angelo Poliziano, (Note: "In the bosom of the tempestuous Aegean / one sees Thetis with bulging belly [...] wandering through the waves in white foam wrapped / and inside born with delicate and joyful movements / a maiden with a non-human face / Of lascivious zephyrs pushed to the shore / Turns on a shell and it seems that the sky rejoices with it. [...] With her right hand the goddess presses her hair / With the other she covers the sweet knob [...] She was welcomed by three nymphs in her bosom / And wrapped in a starry dress". Angelo Poliziano, Giostra, 99–101. (Zuffi & Bussagli (2001, p. 68))) inspired by a Homeric passage that, according to Pliny, had already been painted by Apelles in his work Aphrodite Anadyomene. He used as a model the beautiful aristocrat Simonetta Vespucci, whose figure, despite the classicism of the composition, responds more to Gothic criteria, not so much in terms of proportions, but in rhythm and structure: its curved shape means that the figure is not evenly distributed, but the weight falls more to the right. The wavy movement of its outline and hair gives the sensation of floating in the air. The iconographic type is that of the Venus pudica, which covers her private parts with her arms, a scheme that he partially repeated in the figure of Truth in the Calumny of Apelles, far from any classical component. Other works by Botticelli in which nudes appear are: Saint Sebastian (1474), The Story of Nastagio degli Onesti (1482–1483), Venus and Mars (1483), Pieta with Saint Jerome, Saint Paul and Saint Peter (1490–1492) and Lamentation over the Dead Christ (1492–1495).

Piero di Cosimo, who also portrayed Simonetta Vespucci as Cleopatra (1480), was an original artist whose works had great fantasy, inspiration form mythology, and an eccentric air, but also endowed with feeling and tenderness, where the figures—along with a variety of animals—are immersed in vast landscapes: Vulcan and Aeolus (1490), Venus, Mars and Cupid (1490), The Misfortunes of Silenus (1500), The Death of Procris (1500), The Discovery of Honey by Bacchus (1505–1510), The Fight between the Lapiths and the Centaurs (1515), The Myth of Prometheus (1515), etc.

A more serene classicism is perceived in central Italy, as in the Death of Adam (1452–1466) by Piero della Francesca, whose nude figures have the gravity of the sculpture of Phidias or Polyclitus, or the Apollo and Marsyas (1495) by Perugino, with a clear Praxitelian air. This classicism had its culmination in Raphael's Parnassus (1511), undoubtedly inspired by the Apollo of the Belvedere—which had been discovered in 1479—from which he recovered not only its slender anatomy, but also its rhythm, grace and harmony, glimpsed in the saints, poets and philosophers of the Stanze. However, he did not simply recreate the classical figures, but interpreted them according to his sense of design, to a sweet and harmonious conception of the artist's aesthetic ideal. On the other hand, Raphael, whose work presents a synoptic vision of ideal beauty, was able to extract the most idealistic perfection from the most sensual of the senses. In the Three Graces (1505), he elaborated simple forms, not as ethereal as the graceful Botticellian Venus, but of a classicism that, rather than copied from antiquity, seems innate to the artist, a somewhat naive classicism, but of fresh vitality. In his Adam and Eve (1508) in the papal rooms, Raphael reproduced the female form of the first woman, influenced by Leonardo's Leda, with somewhat knotty volumetry. Later, from his work at La Farnesina, the pleasure villa of Agostino Chigi, his Triumph of Galatea (1511) stands out, inspired by the paintings of Nero's Domus Aurea, and for whose realization Raphael recognized that he had used different parts from different models, since none seemed to him sufficiently perfect—as legend has it that Apelles also did.

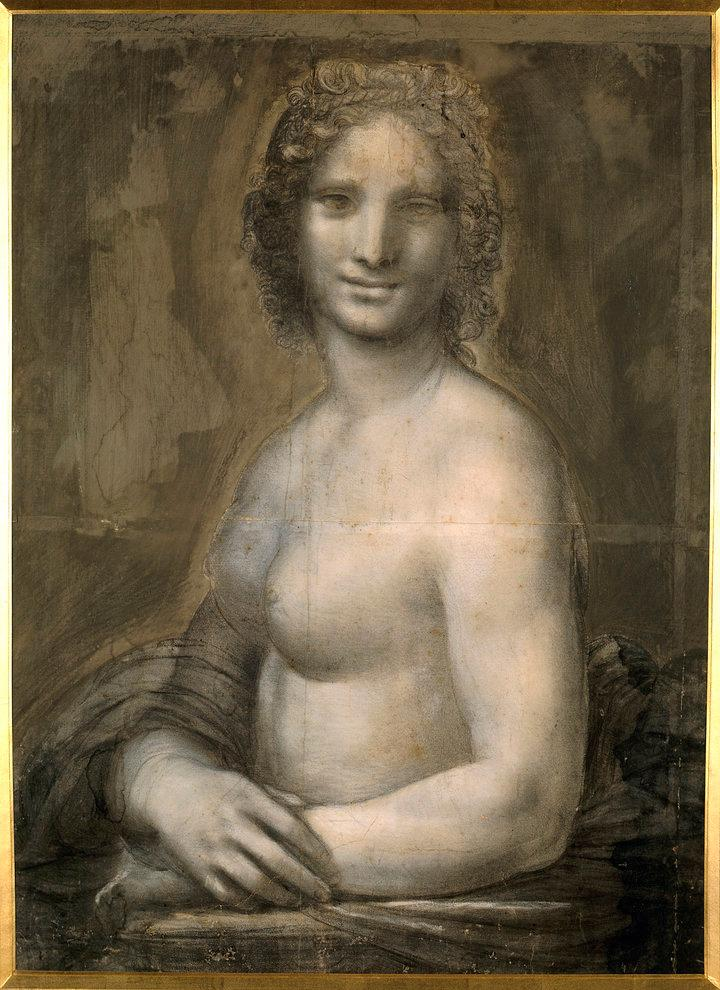
Nude study for La Gioconda (c. 1503), by Leonardo da Vinci, Musée Condé, Chantilly.

In contrast, Leonardo da Vinci departed from classical canons, with naturalistic figures designed based on his extensive anatomical studies. Early on he was inspired by the energetic forms of Pollaiuolo, and The Battle of Anghiari is influenced by Michelangelo's The Battle of Cascina. Later, his deepening in anatomy gave his figures a resounding realism, where the scientific interest can be glimpsed, but at the same time they denote a certain heroic attitude, of moral and human dignity, which gave them a serene vital intensity. However, despite this interest in anatomy, which he captured in hundreds—perhaps thousands—of drawings, which today are scattered in many museums and private collections, in his paintings he only made a few nude representations, such as Bacchus (or St. John the Baptist, 1510–1515), or his Leda and the Swan, of which he made at least three versions between 1504 and 1506, and which is the vindication of the naked woman as a symbol of creative life, and no longer as an unattainable ideal. (Note: Currently only one copy is preserved in the Borghese Gallery in Rome, which is painted in tempera on panel and measures 112 cm high and 86 cm wide. The original, inherited by Salaì at the time and the one that was valued the highest, disappeared. Today it is assumed to be a copy, and not precisely of the original, but a recreation from cardboard by a disciple of Leonardo, Cesare da Sesto. (Clark (2023, pp. 121–122))) For Leonardo, the study of anatomy served him more to know the proportions of the figure to be represented—even if she was dressed—than as an end in itself; thus, for example, there is a half-naked drawing of the famous Mona Lisa, La Gioconda (1503), now in the Musée Condé in Chantilly.

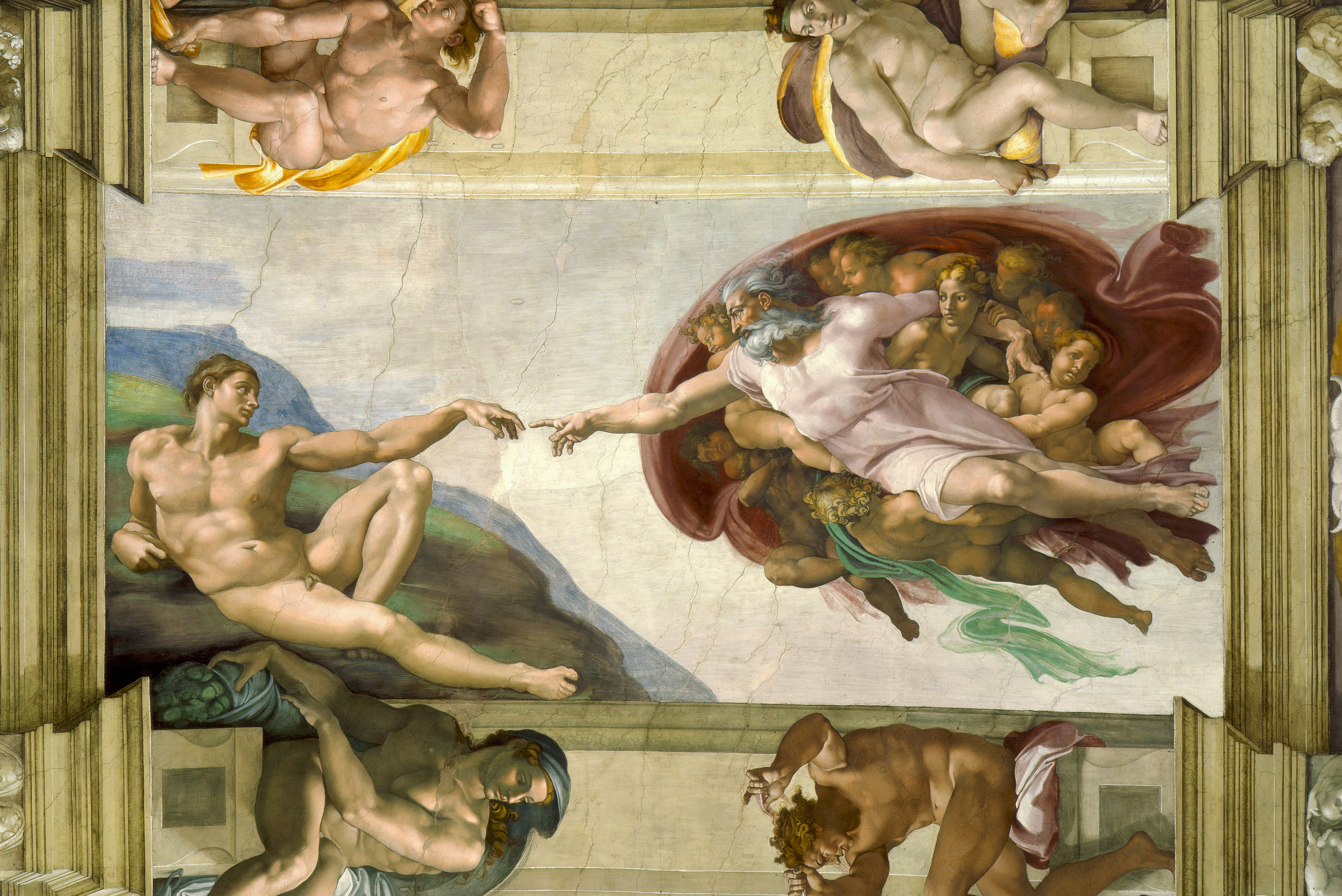
The Creation of Adam (1508–1512), by Michelangelo, Sistine Chapel, Vatican.

The culmination of the Renaissance nude occurred in the work of Michelangelo, for whom the naked human body had a divine character, conferring a dignity unmatched by any other contemporary nude. Because of his Neoplatonic convictions, he idealized in an extreme way the emotion he felt before male beauty, so that the sensuality of his nudes becomes something transcendental, the expression of something superior and immaterial, ungraspable, sublime, pure, infinite. His figures are at once dominant and moving, of great power and great passion, of resounding vitality and intense spiritual energy. Even his religious works have lost the pathos of suffering inherent in the figure of the crucified Christ to show the Savior with a spiritual serenity that generates compassion more for his beauty than for his pain, as in the Vatican Pieta (1498–1499). His first nude drawings show the vivacity of his nervous articulations, far from the soft classical contours, with a rich modeling far from any proportion or geometric scheme. His anatomy is knotty and tight, dynamic, with the thickness of the torso standing out, marked muscles, and solid contours, exaggerating the effects of torsion and foreshortened figures, as in the Drunken Bacchus (1496–1497), one of his first great sculptures. The David (1501–1504) in Florence still retains the Apollonian air of a balanced classicism, but interpreted in a personal way, where the torso may look like that of a Greek statue. Still, the disproportion of head and limbs denotes tension, and his defiant expression departs from the classical ethos. Likewise with the dramatic expression of his Slaves in the Louvre (Dying Slave and Rebellious Slave, 1513), which recall the Hellenistic art's noobide figures, and denote the influence of Laocoön (Michelangelo was one of the first to see the sculptural group, unearthed in 1506 near San Pietro in Vincoli). Similarly, his figures for the Medici tombs (1524) are reminiscent of Greek works: the male ones (The Day and The Twilight) to the Belvedere Torso, and the female ones (The Dawn and The Night) to the Vatican's Ariadne.

Later, his idea of a rotund and vibrant anatomy, but charged with emotional intensity, was embodied in his Adam of the Sistine Chapel (1508–1512), reminiscent of the Dionysus of the Parthenon pediment, but with a vital charge far removed from the harmonious Phidian sculpture. Similarly, the figures of the athletes (usually called ignudi, "naked") on the ceiling of the Sistine have the balance of athletic energy together with the transcendence of their sacred mission—they represent the souls of the biblical prophets—harmoniously exercising their mediating role between the physical and spiritual worlds, so that their physical beauty is a reflection of divine perfection. In other scenes, such as The Flood (1509), he also shows vigorous figures whose physical power reveals their spiritual strength. The Creation of Eve (1509–1510) presents a rotund, vigorous female figure, with very marked contours. On the other hand, the Christ of the Last Judgment (1536–1541) has the solemnity of an Apollo understood as sol justitiae, but with a rotundity—patent in his almost square torso—already far removed from the classical canons. His representation of Jesus is no longer the typical bearded figure of Byzantine tradition, but the effigy of an Olympian god or a Hellenistic king, closer to Alexander the Great than to a Jewish carpenter, with a more athletic build than one would expect from the mystical Christian ascetic. In his last works, the three piéades (the Palestrina, the Duomo and the Rondanini Pietà), he completely abandoned the ideal of physical beauty, with distorted figures (Palestrina), angular (Duomo) or with a schematism close to the Gothic (Rondanini).

The first to fully understand, since the great age of Greek sculpture, the identity of the nude with the great figurative art, was Michelangelo. Before him it had been studied with a scientific view, as a means of capturing the figure wrapped in clothing. Michelangelo saw that it was an end in itself and made the nude the supreme purpose of his art. For him, art and nude were synonymous.

— Bernard Berenson, Italian Renaissance painters (1954)

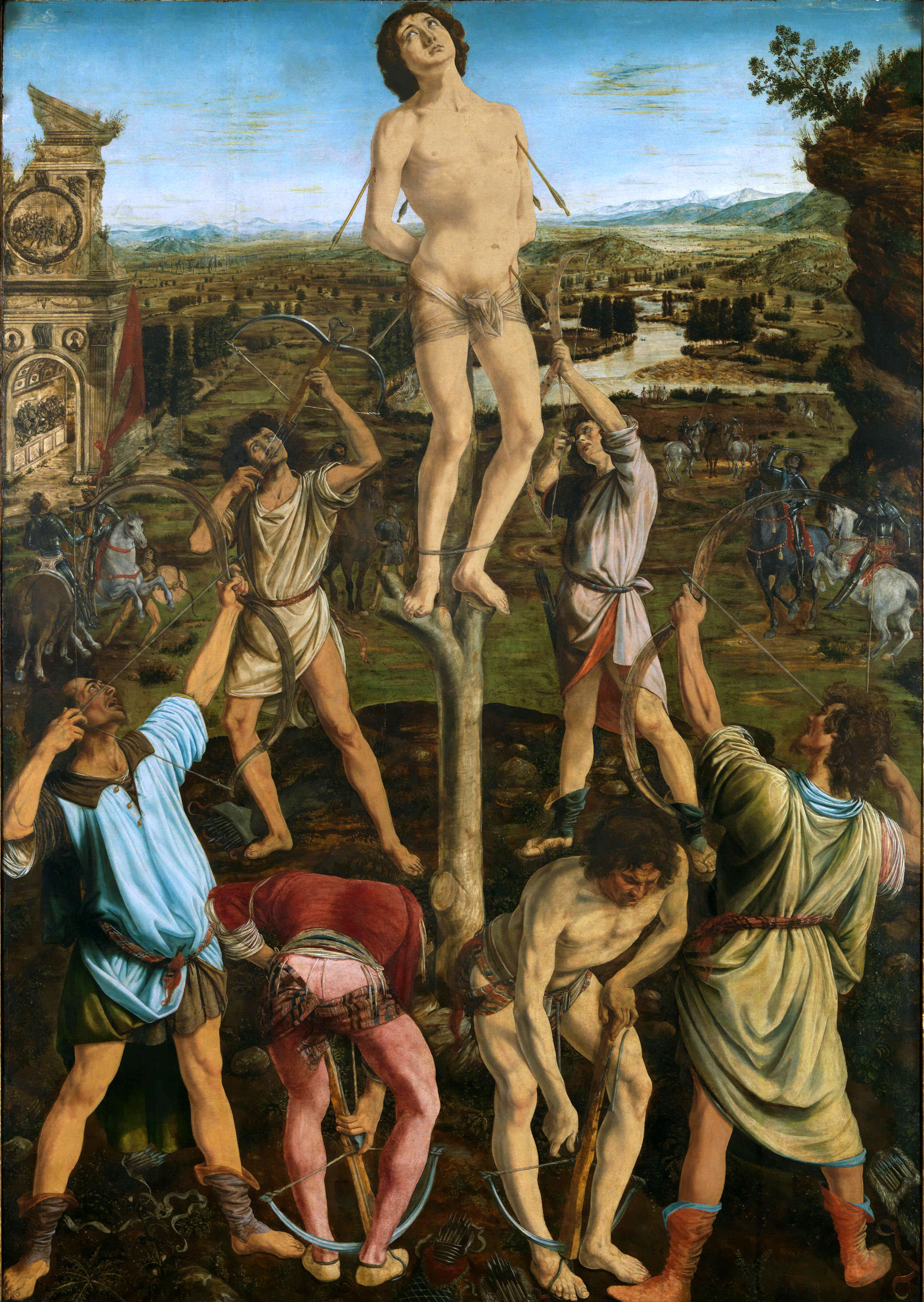
Martyrdom of Saint Sebastian (1475), by Antonio and Piero del Pollaiuolo, National Gallery, London.

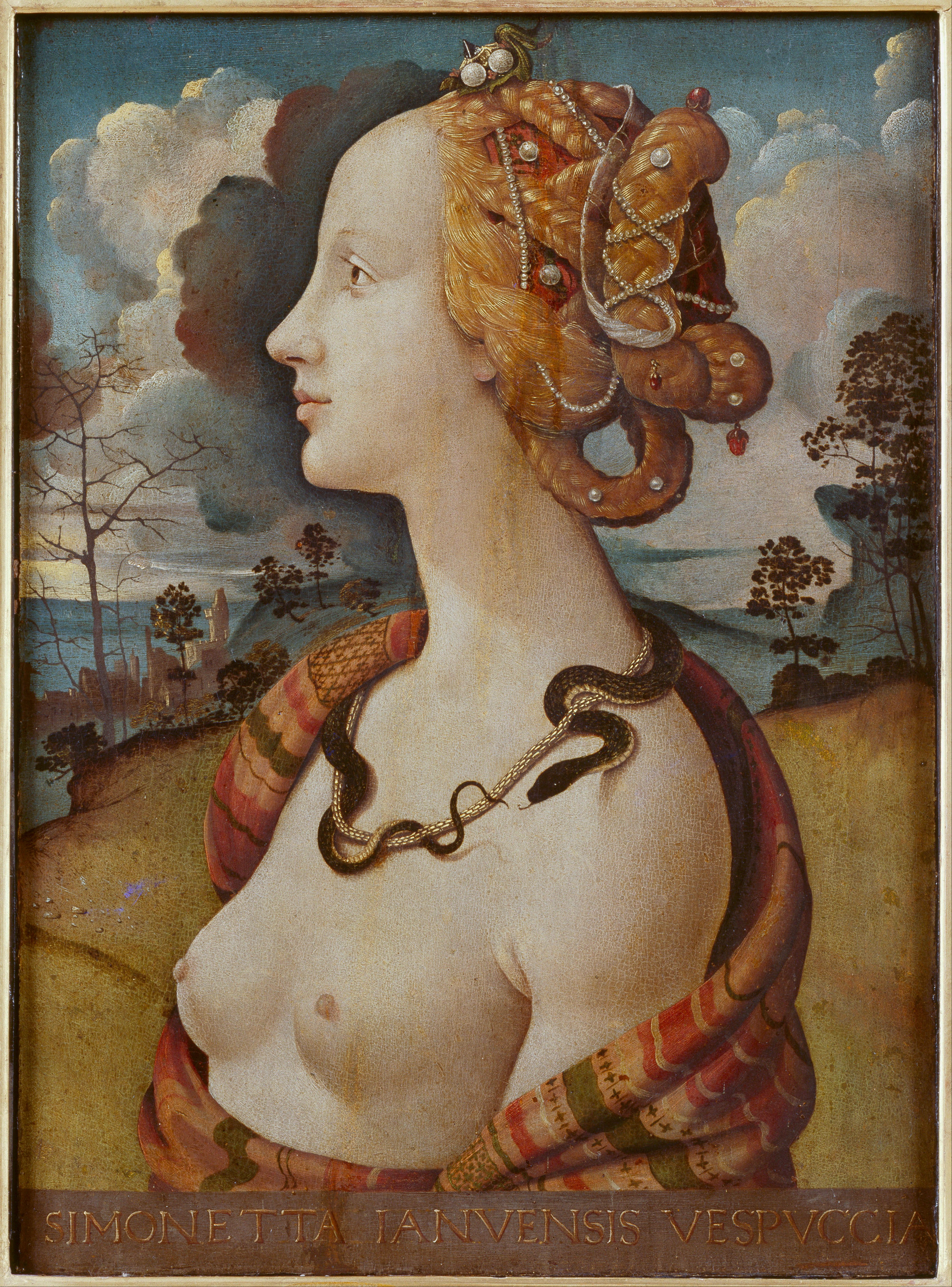
Portrait of Simonetta Vespucci (1480), de Piero di Cosimo, Musée Condé, Chantilly.

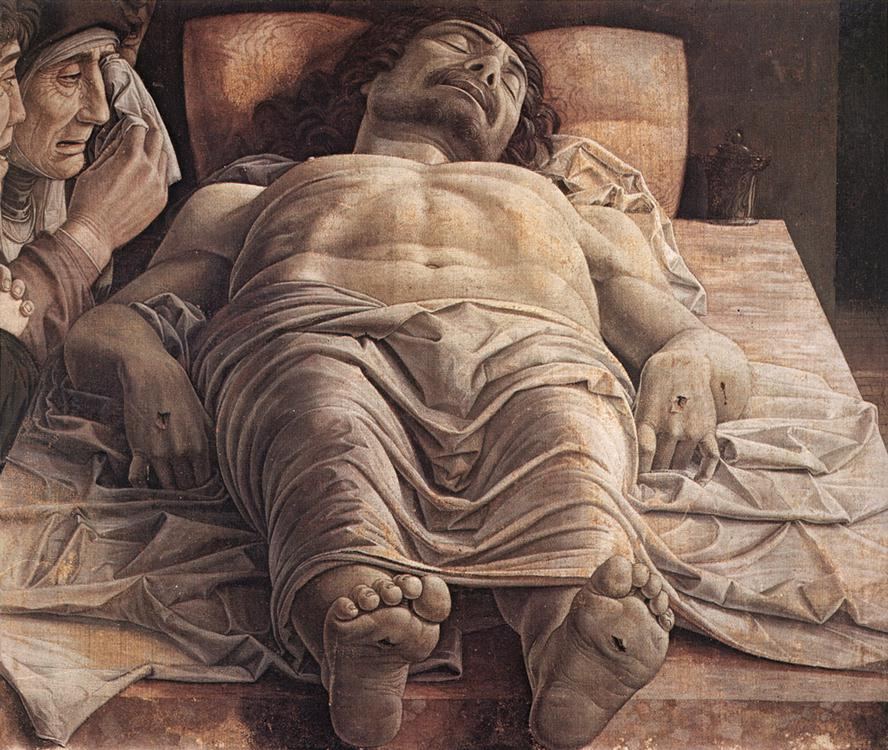
Lamentation of Christ (1480–1490), by Andrea Mantegna, Pinacoteca di Brera, Milan.

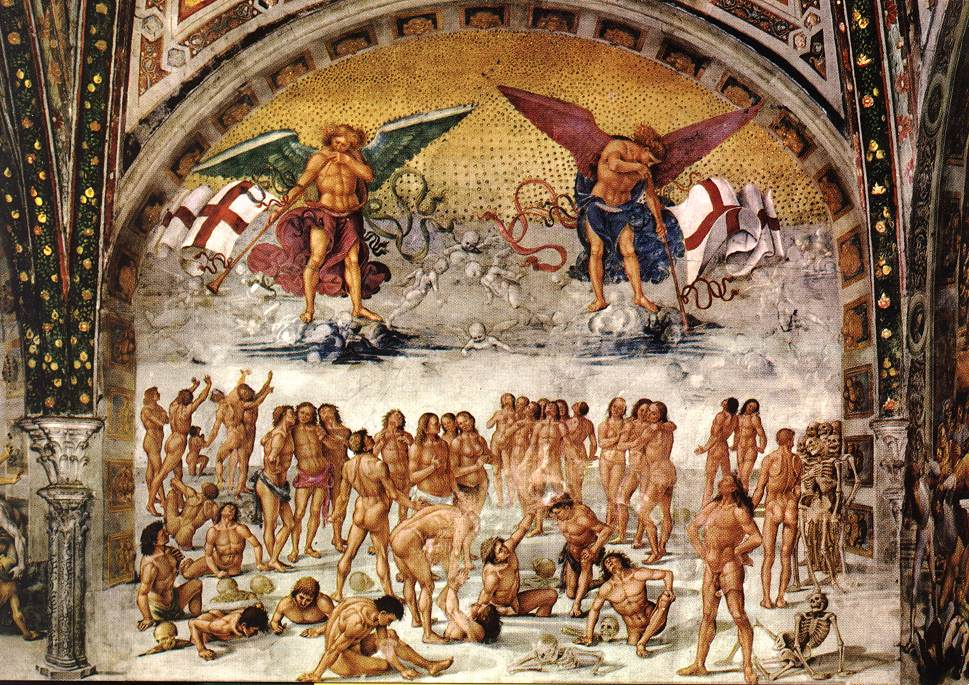
The Resurrection of the Flesh (1499), by Luca Signorelli, Chapel of San Brizio, Orvieto Cathedral.

La Fornarina (1518–1519), by Raphael, National Gallery of Ancient Art, Rome.

In the sixteenth century, the nude was widely disseminated thanks to the engravings of classical Greco-Roman works, especially those produced by Marcantonio Raimondi. The Venetian school emerged, making important contributions to the nude, not only through the continuity of certain classicist approaches but also through innovation and experimentation with new technical and stylistic approaches. The Venetians managed to harmonize the nude within more elaborate compositions, whether indoors or in the framework of a natural landscape, while their chromatic and lighting innovations gave greater realism and sensuality to the nude, with large, exuberant figures that began to move away from the classical canon. This can be seen in Giovanni Bellini's Naked Young Woman in Front of a Mirror (1515). However, the main initiator of this style was Giorgione, who was the first to structure the female nude within a general decorative scheme, as in his frescoes of the Fondaco dei Tedeschi (1507–1508, now disappeared), in his Pastoral Concert (1510) or in his Sleeping Venus (1507–1510), whose reclining posture has been copied ad nauseam. It is worth noting that the physical typology of Giorgione's nudes, of generous proportions and wide waist, would dominate the Venetian female nude for a long time, and that it passed, through Dürer, to Germany and the Netherlands, enduring in the Baroque in the work of artists such as Rubens.

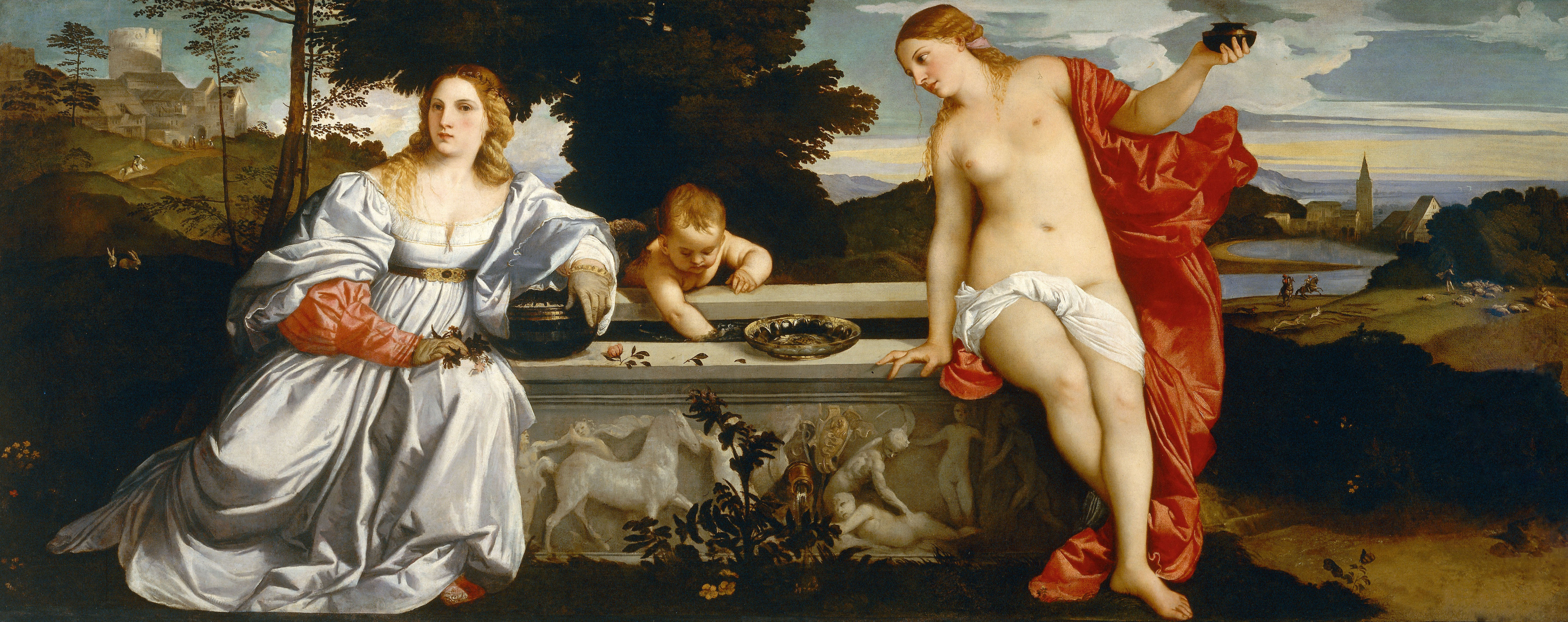
Sacred and Profane Love (1514–1515), by Titian, Borghese Gallery, Rome. The clothed woman represents the Venus Pandemos or "mundane Venus", while the naked one is the Venus Urania or "celestial Venus", following the neoplatonic interpretation made by Ficino.

An early imitator of Giorgione was Titian, whose Venus of Urbino (1538) and Pardo Venus (or Jupiter and Antiope, 1534–1540) reproduce the same posture as the Sleeping Venus, acquiring, however, greater fame. In Sacred and Profane Love (1514–1515), he captured the myth of Plato's Symposium of the celestial Venus and the mundane one recovered by Ficino and the Florentine neoplatonic school. The celestial Venus is the naked one, following the ideal of the classical nude, given the purity of her moral virtue, while the worldly one appears clothed, because of the shame of her immorality. In other works he continued with his prototype of woman of exuberant and fleshy forms, as in Bacchus and Ariadne (1520–1523), Penitent Magdalene (1531–1533), Venus and Musician (1547), Venus with an Organist, Cupid and a Dog (1550), Danae receiving the golden rain (1553), Venus and Adonis (1553), The Rape of Europa (1559–1562), Diana and Actaeon (1559), Diana and Callisto (1559), the two Bacchanals painted for Alfonso I d'Este (1518–1526), or his Venus Anadyomene (1520) from the Ellesmere collection, whose unabashed sensuality is the starting point of the nude as a theme in itself, which would be recovered in Impressionism.

Disciples of Titian were Paris Bordone (Sleeping Venus with Cupid, 1540; Bathsheba Bathing, 1549; Venus and Mars with Cupid, 1560) and Tintoretto, whose ambition—not entirely achieved—was to reunite Michelangelo's drawing with Titian's coloring. The works of the latter are large, with a multitude of figures, with dazzling lights that reflect the luminous quality of his beloved Venice. In his decoration of the Venetian Doge's Palace (1560–1578) he made an authentic apotheosis of the nude, with multiple figures from classical mythology (Mars, Minerva, Mercury, Bacchus, Ariadne, Vulcan, the Three Graces), in positions where the foreshortening is usually abundant, in a great variety of postures and perspectives. His other nude works include: Joseph and Potiphar's Wife (1544), Adam and Eve (1550–1552), Venus, Vulcan and Mars (1555), The Liberation of Arsínoe (1555–1556), Susanna and the Elders (1560–1565), The Origin of the Milky Way (1575–1582), Judith and Holofernes (1579), etc. His daughter, Marietta Robusti, followed in his footsteps, while serving as a model for her father on numerous occasions.

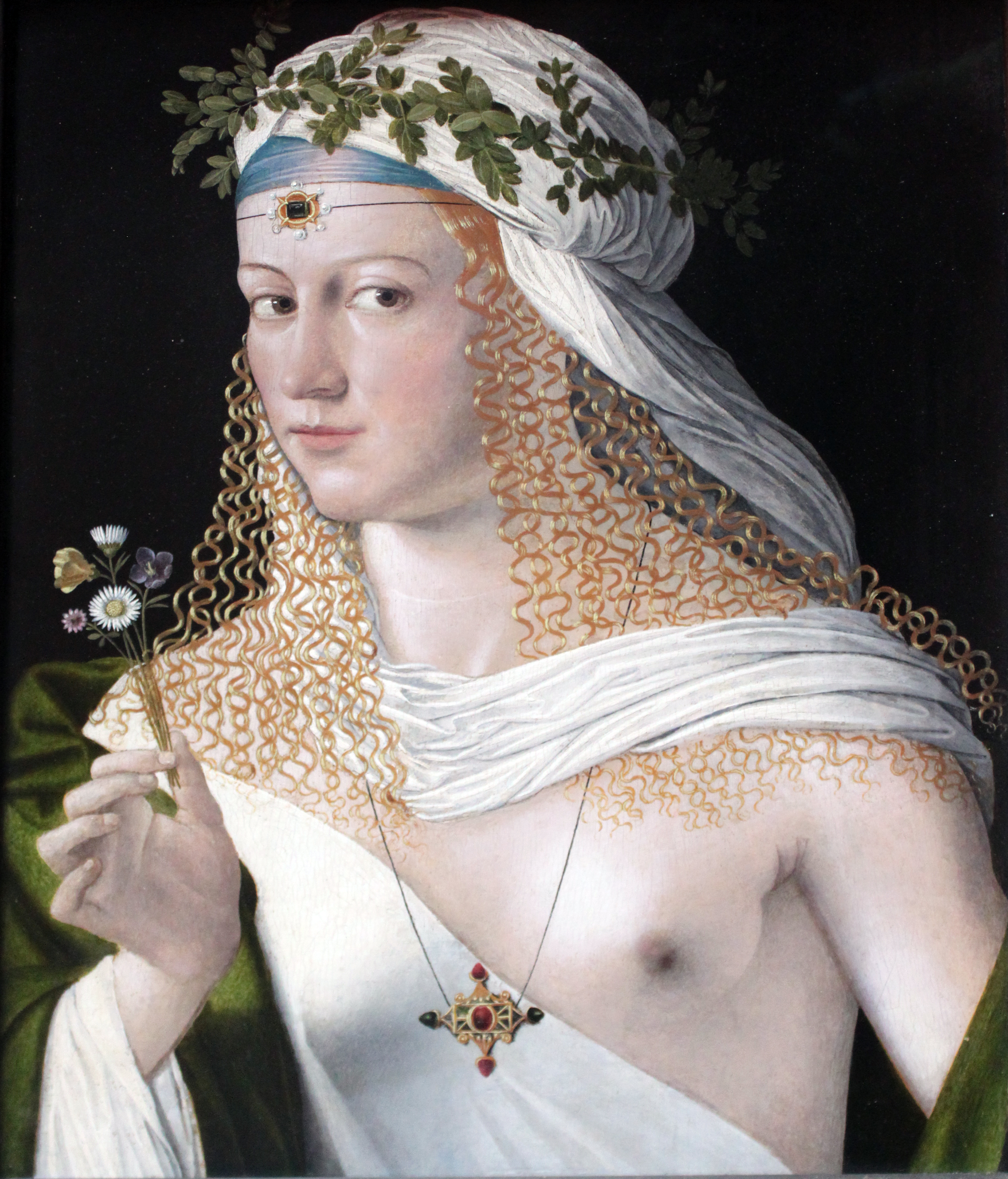
Supposed portrait of Lucrezia Borgia, by Bartolomeo Veneto, Städel Institute, Frankfurt am Main.

Paolo Veronese also mastered to perfection the coloring, wisely combined in infinite shades, as well as the composition, dedicated to recreating lavish, playful, ornamental scenes, emphasizing the pomp of the Doge's Venice. Even his religious scenes have a festive, joyful, worldly, sometimes somewhat irreverent character. However, his nudes were demure, restrained, modest, without showing anything explicit, just some naked area between tunics or folds of clothing, as in Allegory of Love I; Infidelity (1575–1580), The Creation of Eve (1575–1580), Mars and Venus (1580), Susanna and the Elders (1580) and Venus and Adonis (1580).

For his part, Correggio moved away from all classicism to elaborate original compositions only subordinated to the overflowing imagination of the artist, not only in terms of forms and figures, but also in the chromatic games and lighting effects, influenced by Leonardo's sfumato. In works such as Venus and Cupid with a Satyr (or Jupiter and Antiope, 1524–1525), The Education of Cupid (1528), Danae (1530), Leda and the Swan (1531–1532) and Jupiter and Io (1531–1532), he shows figures in capricious, dynamic positions that stand out luminously from the rest of the painting, which is darker, thus focusing the main point of interest for the artist.

In the second half of the 16th century, Mannerism emerged, (Note: The word derives from the Italian term maniera, which meant "style," and was introduced by Giorgio Vasari in his biographies of artists to denote the graceful and balanced style of the artists of his time. (Chilvers (2007, p. 593))) with which modern art began in a certain way: things are not represented as they are, but as the artist sees them. Beauty is relativized, from the single Renaissance beauty, based on science, to the multiple beauties of Mannerism, derived from nature. For the mannerists, classical beauty is empty, soulless, counterposing a spiritual, dreamlike, subjective, unregulated beauty—summarized in Petrarch's formula non-so ché ("I don't know what"). The mannerist nude will be of elongated, exaggerated, slender forms, of an almost mannered elegance. Part, on the one hand, of the formal distortion of Michelangelo and, on the other, of the elegance of Parmigianino. A good example is the Allegory of Venus and Cupid (or Allegory of Passion, 1540–1545) by Bronzino, whose Venus, so slender and with an almost lascivious attitude, comes, however, by its zigzag posture from the dead Christ of the Michelangelo's Pietà. These slender figures of refined grace also abounded in sculpture, preferably in bronze, developed by artists such as Baccio Bandinelli (Hercules and Cacus, 1534, located next to Michelangelo's David in the Piazza della Signoria in Florence), Bartolomeo Ammannati (Leda and the Swan, 1535; Venus, 1558; Fountain of Neptune, 1563–1565), Benvenuto Cellini (Crucifix of El Escorial, 1539; Saltcellar of Francis I, 1540–1543; Ganymede, 1547; Perseus with the Head of Medusa, 1554) or Giambologna (Samson Slaying a Philistine, 1562; Mercury, 1564; Fountain of Neptune, 1565; Florence Triumphant over Pisa, 1570; Rape of the Sabine Women, 1582; Hercules and the Centaur Nessus, 1599). On the other hand, the tragic side of the nude—that of Hellenistic pathos—was cultivated by Pontormo and Rosso Fiorentino, generally with religious subjects, which could better express Mannerist emotionalism, such as Rosso's Moses Defending the Daughters of Jethro (1523), whose flat, angular bodies are the antithesis of classicism.

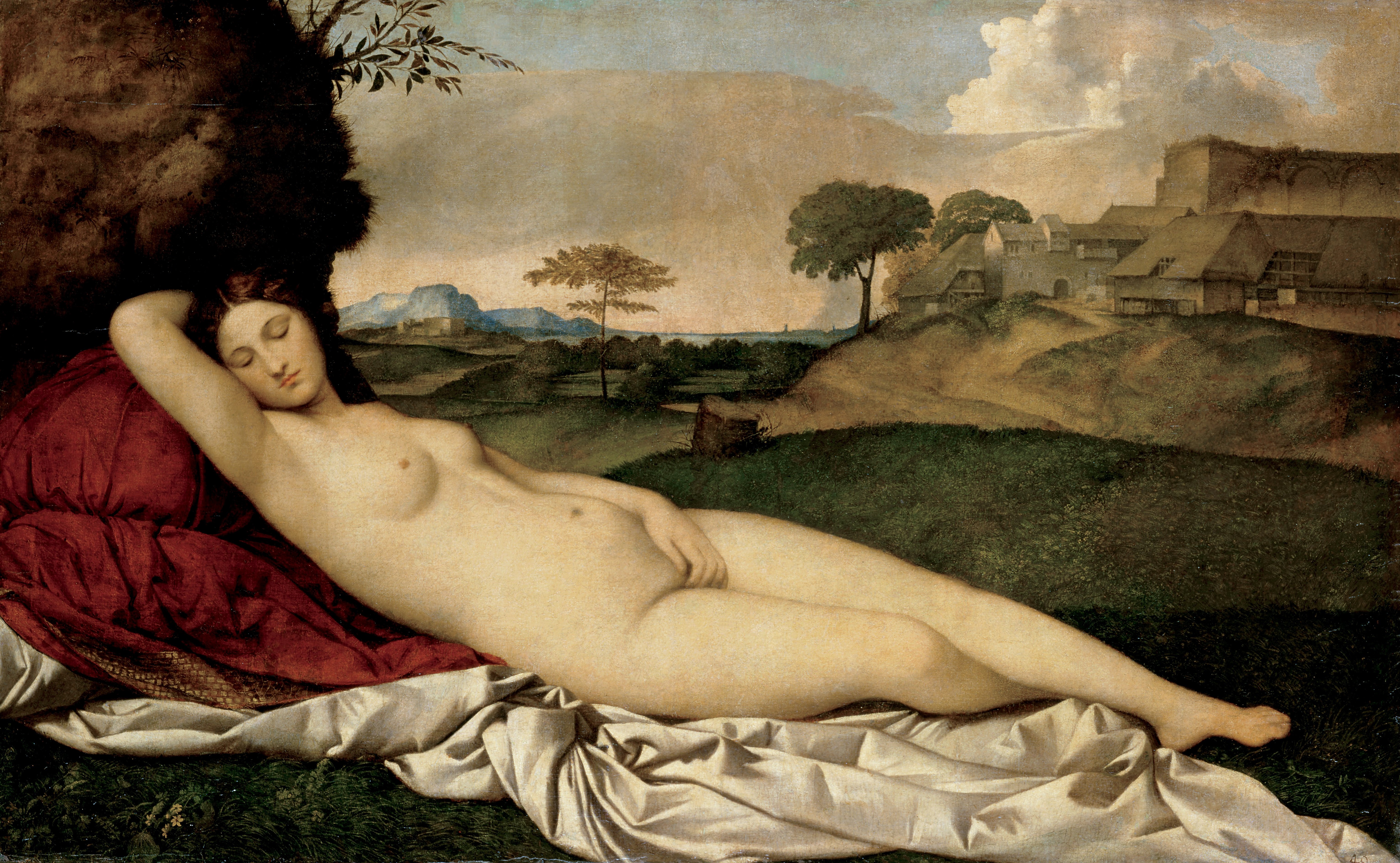
Sleeping Venus (1507–1510), by Giorgione, Gemäldegalerie Alte Meister, Dresden.

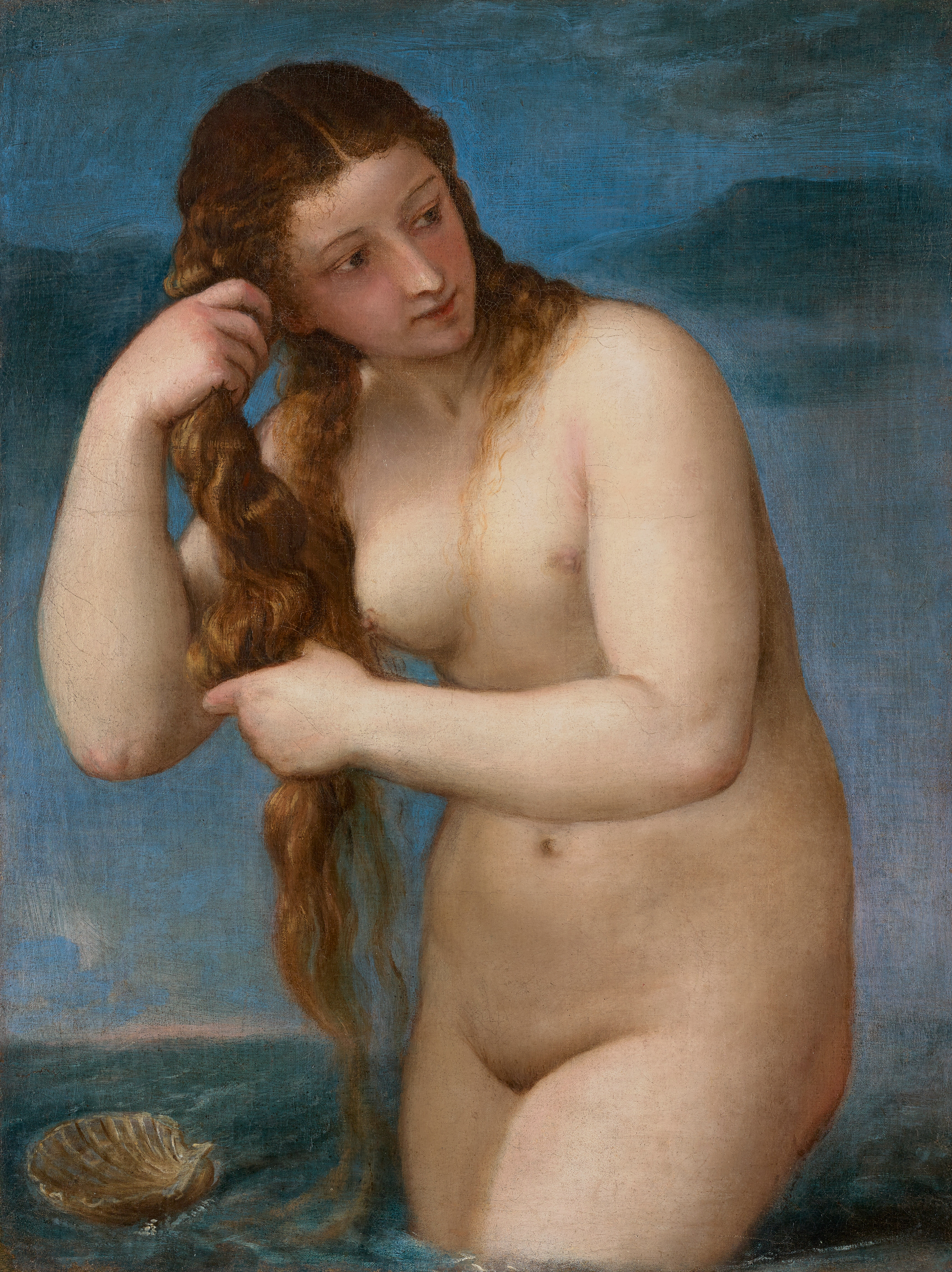
Venus Anadyomene (1520), by Titian, Scottish National Gallery, Edinburgh.

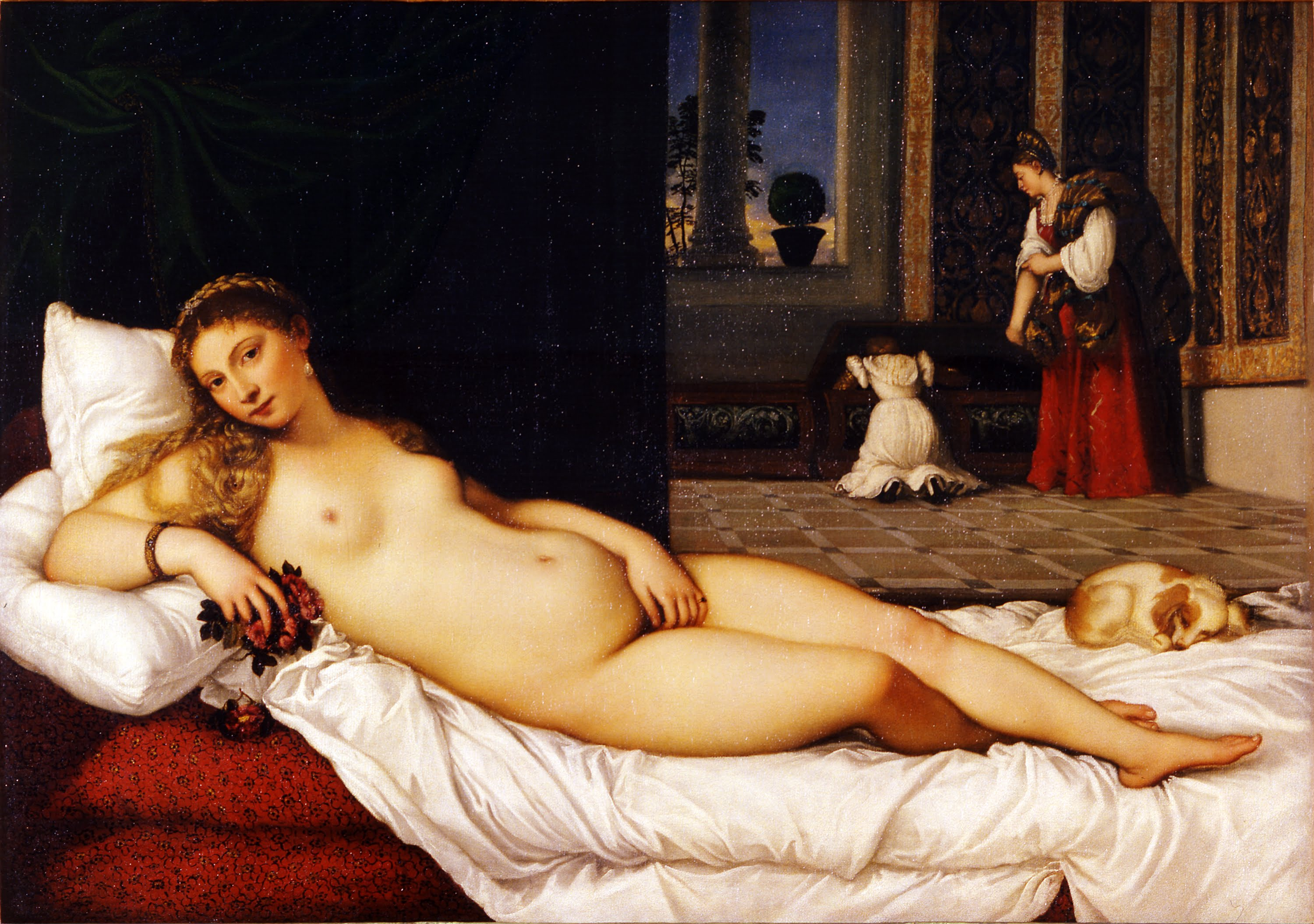
Venus of Urbino (1538), by Titian, Uffizi Gallery, Florence.

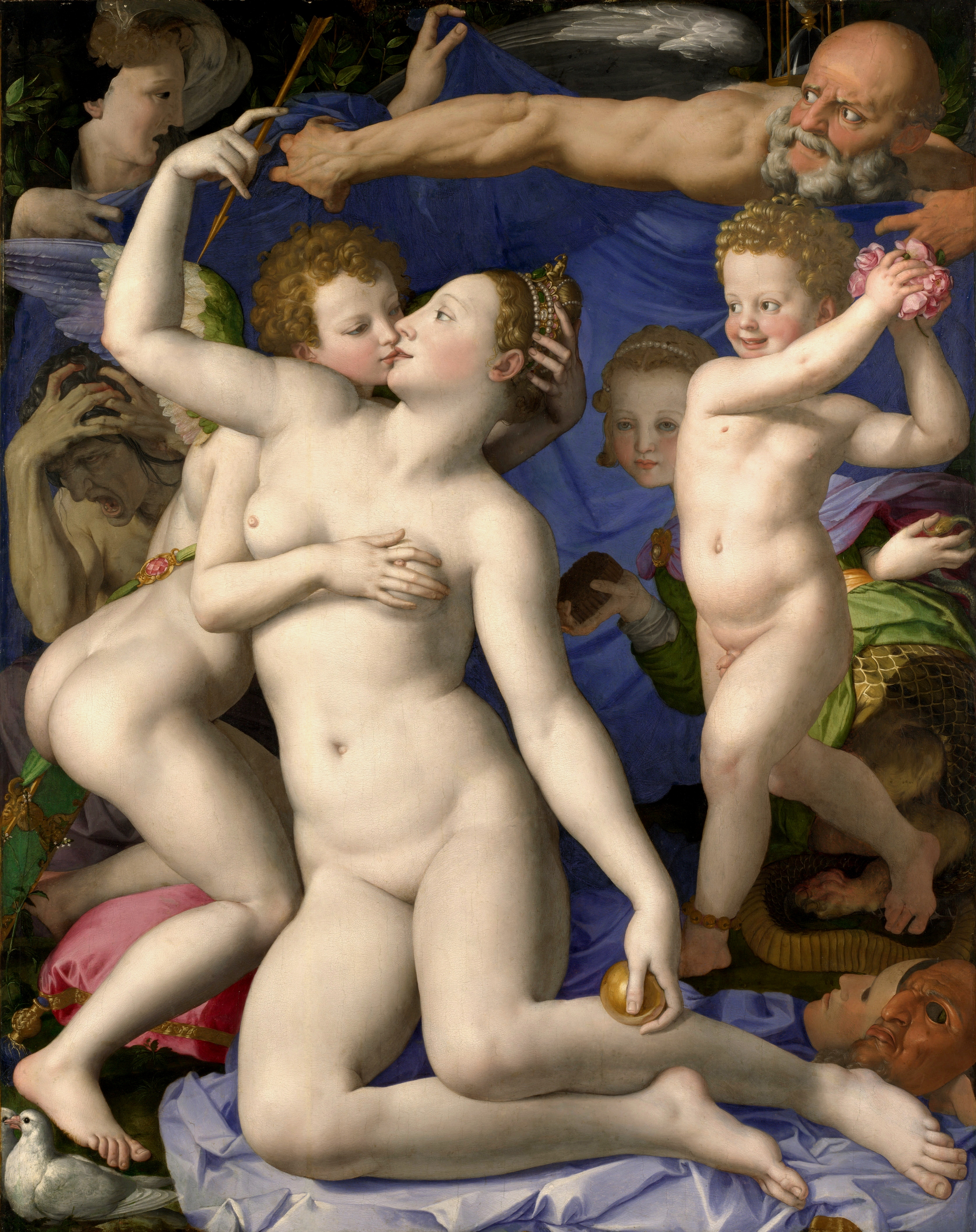
Allegory of Venus and Cupid (1540–1545), by Bronzino, National Gallery, London.

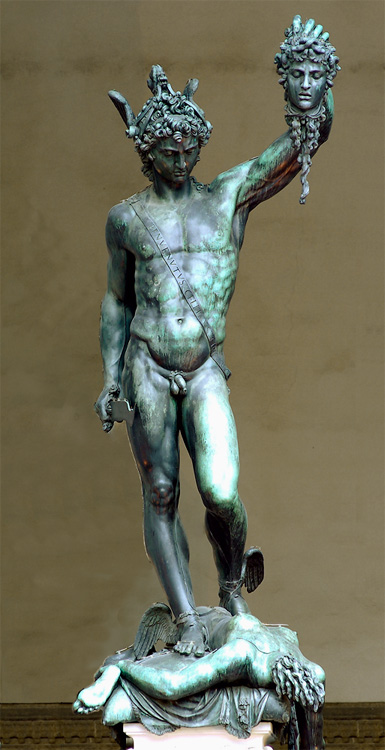
Perseus with the Head of Medusa (1554), by Benvenuto Cellini, Loggia dei Lanzi, Florence.

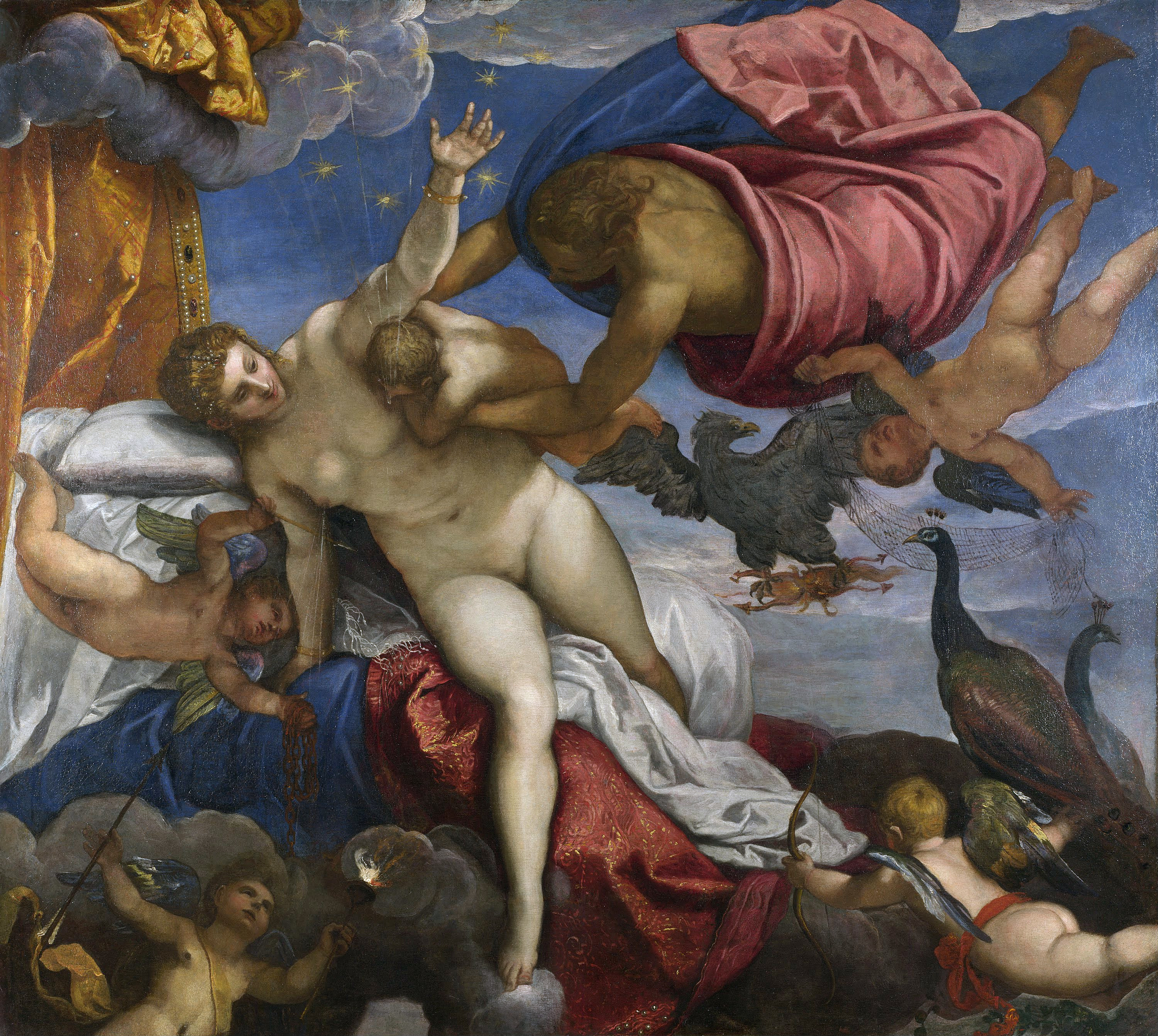
The Origin of the Milky Way (1575), by Tintoretto, National Gallery, London.

During the 16th century, the acceptance of the nude as an artistic theme, which spread from Italy to the rest of Europe, generated a great demand for these works, especially in Germany and the Netherlands, by a bourgeois public that avidly consumed them. The representation of the nude was so popular that it even appeared on the title page of Erasmus of Rotterdam's New Testament. One of the most popular artists in this field was Lucas Cranach the Elder, who throughout his work elaborated a more personal version of the Nordic nude of Gothic origin, which, while retaining its rounded forms, is shown more stylized and subject to classical canons, with long, slender legs, thin waist and gently undulating silhouette, as in Venus and Cupid (1509), Spring nymph at the fountain (1518), Lucretia (1525), Judgement of Paris (1527), Adam and Eve (1528), Apollo and Diana (1530), The Three Graces (1530), The Golden Age (1530), Venus (1532), Venus and Cupid stealing Honey (1534), Allegory of Justice (1537), The Fountain of Youth (1546), Diana and Actaeon (1550–1553), etc. His figures are presented with multiple props (hats, belts, veils, necklaces), which enhances the eroticism of his models, establishing an imagery that would often be repeated in the future.

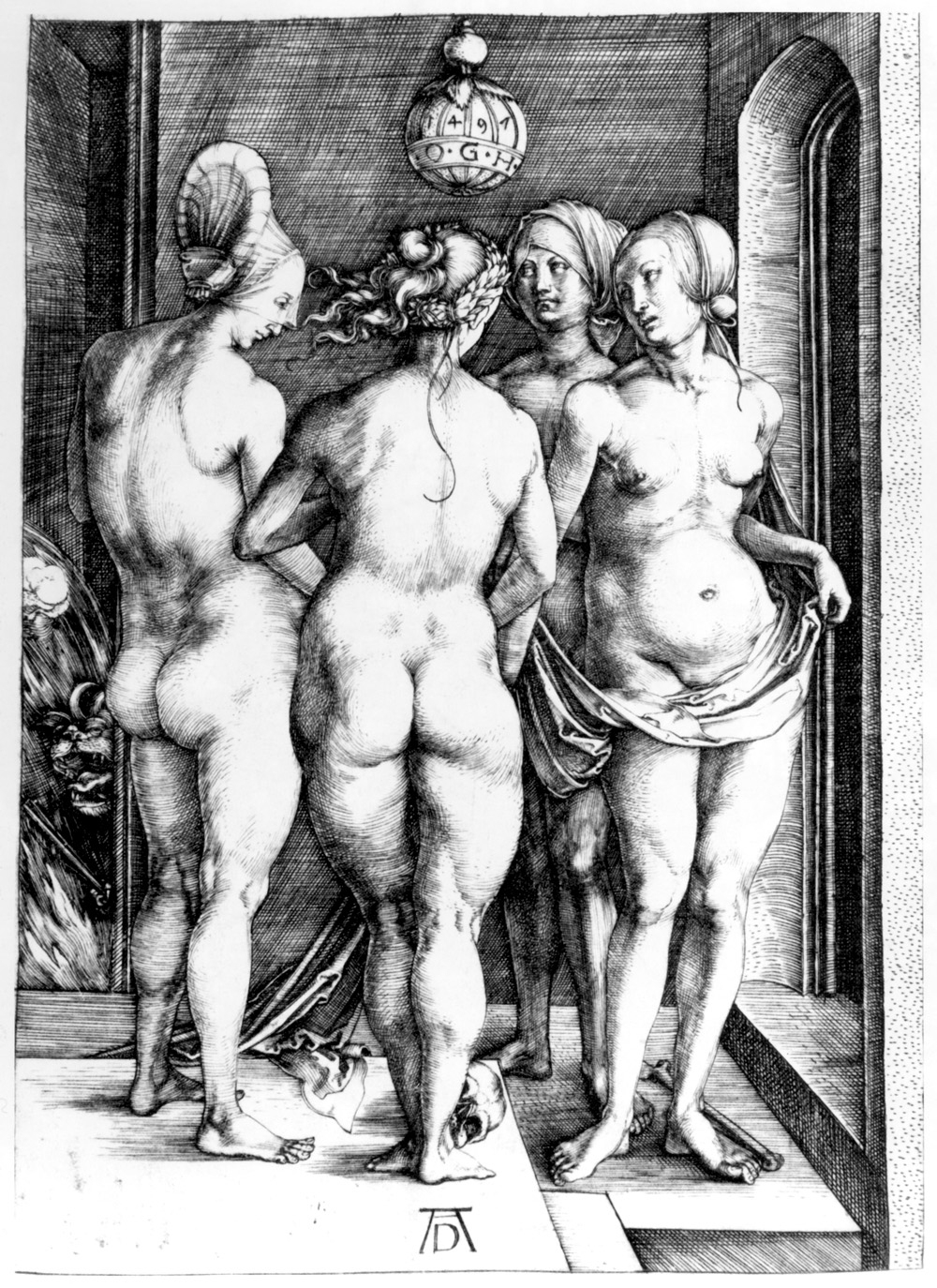
The Four Witches (1497), by Albrecht Dürer, Germanisches Nationalmuseum, Nürnberg.

Albrecht Dürer inherited the forms of Gothic art so deeply rooted in his country, but evolved thanks to the study of Italian Renaissance classicism. Some of his early works show the Gothic female prototype of elongated figures with small breasts and bulging bellies, as in Hausfrau (1493), Women's Bath (1496), and The Four Witches (1497). Subsequently, he devoted himself to the study of proportions in the human body, seeking the key to anatomical perfection, though without success. However, in this way he approached a certain classicist style, as can be seen in his Adam and Eve of 1504, which shows that classical harmony was more a state of mind than a canon of geometric rules. Even so, he was not satisfied, and in his last works he returned to the bulbous forms of Gothic art, as in The Suicide of Lucretia (1518). An excellent engraver as well as painter, some of his best nudes are engravings, such as Berenice, The Dream of the Doctor and The Sea Monster, or allegories and the series of Imperial Triumphs, or his prints on the passion and death of Jesus and the lives of saints such as St. Jerome, St. Genevieve and St. Mary Magdalene. Dürer's work influenced many artists of the Germanic world, in works where Gothic forms intermingle with classical ideals, as can be seen in the work of Urs Graf (The Raging Army, 1520) and Niklaus Manuel Deutsch (Judgment of Paris, 1516–1528).

Hans Baldung was also a disciple of Dürer, author of allegorical works of strong moralizing content, generally with personifications of death or the ages of man, recalling the ephemeral nature of life: St. Sebastian Triptych (1507), The Two Lovers and Death (1509–1511), The Three Ages of Woman and Death (1510), Eve, the Serpent and Death (1512), Three Witches (1514), Death and a Woman (1518–1520), Vanity (1529), Hercules and Antaeus (1530), Adam and Eve (1535), The Seven Ages of Woman (1544), etc. For his part, Hans Holbein the Younger was preferably the author of religious paintings and portraits, dealing little with the nude, of which, however, we must highlight his magnificent The Body of the Dead Christ in the Tomb (1521).

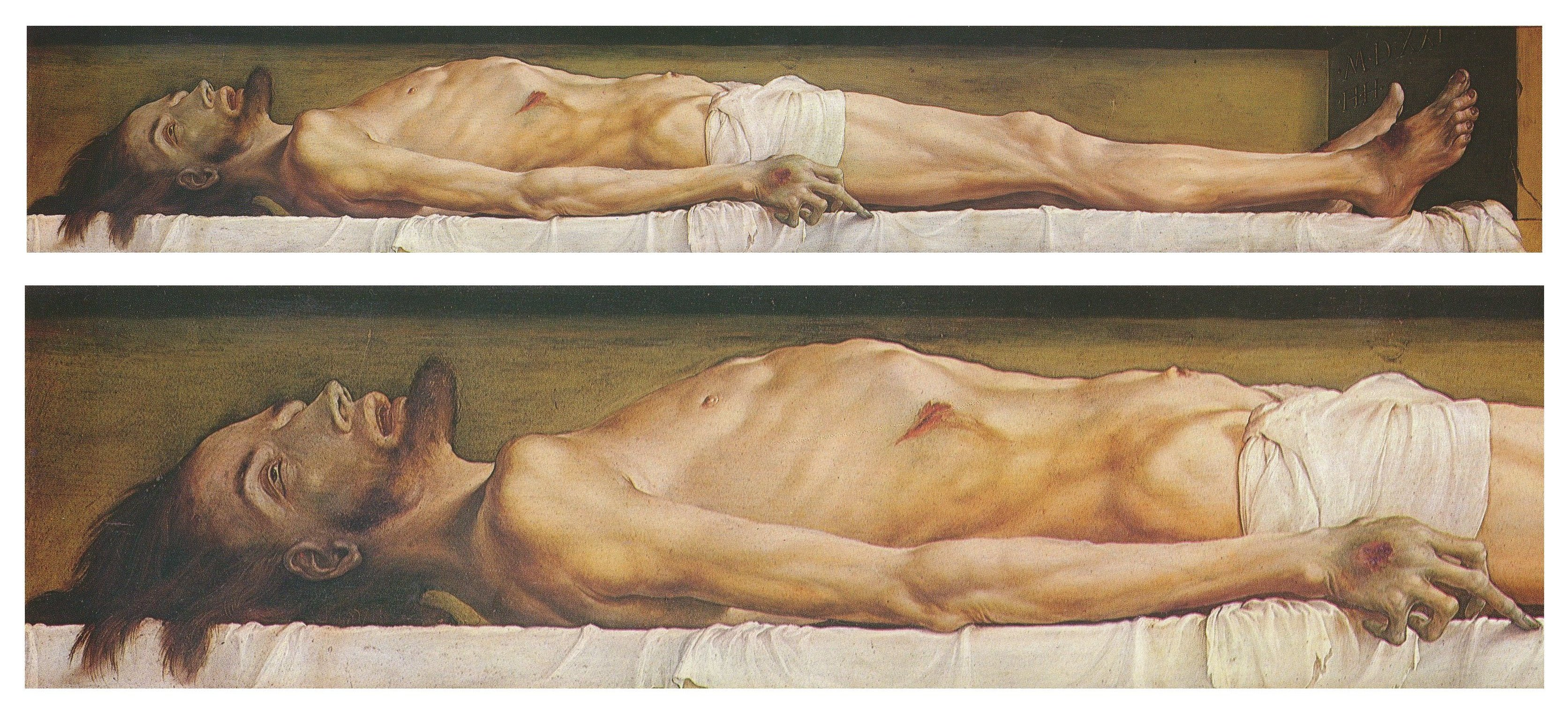
The Body of the Dead Christ in the Tomb (1521), by Hans Holbein the Younger, Kunstmuseum, Basel.

In the Netherlands, Hieronymus Bosch represented a certain continuity of Gothic forms, although treated with greater naturalism and with an overflowing fantasy that would make his work a marvel of creativity and imagination. In The Garden of Earthly Delights (1480–1490), The Last Judgment (1482), The Seven Deadly Sins and the Four Last Things (1485) and The Haywain Triptych (1500–1502), the naked, human or subhuman form (demons, satyrs, mythological animals, monsters and fantastic creatures) proliferates in a paroxysm of lust that transcends any iconographic meaning and obeys only the feverish imagination of the artist. Pieter Bruegel the Elder also made works of wide panoramic and multitude of figures, with a predilection for landscapes and genre portraits, although his nudes are scarce. They are more evident in the work of his son, Jan Brueghel de Velours, who painted landscapes with a proliferation of small nude figures in mythological or biblical scenes. In Flanders, Jan Gossaert received the Raphaelesque influence, being the introducer in his country of the mythological fable, as in Neptune and Amphitrite (1516), The Metamorphosis of Hermaphrodite and Salmacis (1520) and Danae (1527).

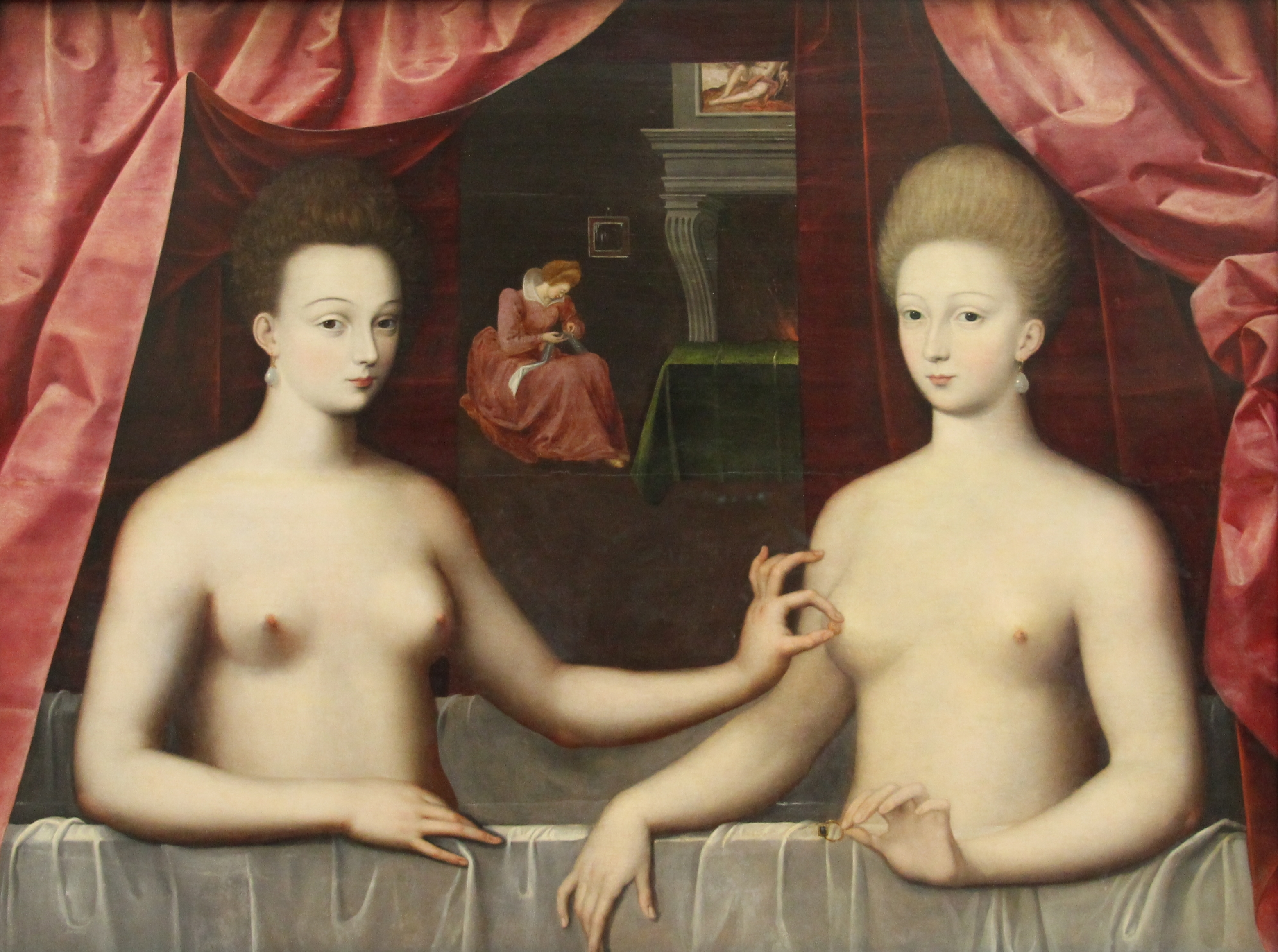
Portrait of Gabrielle d'Estrées and her sister the Duchess of Villars (1594), anonymous author of the School of Fontainebleau, Musée du Louvre, Paris.

In France, art evolved rapidly from Gothic to Mannerism, with the Classicist influence of the early Renaissance hardly felt, mainly due to the stay in the works of the Palace of Fontainebleau of several Italian Mannerist artists (Rosso Fiorentino, Francesco Primaticcio, Benvenuto Cellini), who gave rise to the School of Fontainebleau, characterized by a courtly and sensualist taste, decorative, voluptuous, languid elegance, with a predominance of mural painting and stucco relief. Primaticcio's elegant and angular figures, with long limbs and small heads, became fashionable and remained in French art until the end of the 16th century. Some works of this school are by unknown artists, such as the Diana the Huntress (c. 1550) and the Portrait of Gabrielle d'Estrées and her sister the Duchess of Villars (1594), which reflect a fine eroticism of the gallant court. Of known artists are: Eve Prima Pandora (1550), by Jean Cousin the Elder; The Bath of Diana (1550), by François Clouet; The Awakening of a Lady, by Toussaint Dubreuil; and, in sculpture, Diana the Huntress (1550) by Jean Goujon, and The Three Graces (1560) by Germain Pilon. The nude was also reflected in this same environment in all kinds of minor arts, from tapestry to ceramics and goldsmithing, such as the famous enameled plate with the Story of Adam and Eve in six passages, by Pierre Rémond.

In Spain, the Renaissance influence arrived late, with Gothic forms surviving until almost the middle of the 16th century. Otherwise, the innovations were more stylistic than thematic, with religious themes predominating as in medieval times. El Greco was one of the main innovators of Spanish painting of the time: trained in the Venetian school, his works show the intense coloring of that school, although his long, disproportionate figures suggest a certain formal expressionism rather than Italian classicist naturalism. Although most of his works are religious, in them he does not fail to show nude figures more or less justified by the theme, being able to count in all his production more than a hundred nudes. This can be seen in works such as The Martyrdom of St. Sebastian (1577–1578), St. John the Baptist (1577–1579), Holy Trinity (1577–1580), The Martyrdom of St. Maurice (1580–1582), Christ on the Cross Adored by Two Donors (1590), The Baptism of Christ (1596–1600), The Crucifixion (1597–1600), St. Martin and the Beggar (1597–1600), Christ Driving the Money Changers from the Temple (1609), The Vision of Saint John (1609–1614), Laocoön and his Sons (1614), etc. Also, as a sculptor, he left works such as his Epimetheus and Pandora (1600–1610) of the Prado Museum, where it is worth noting the realism of the sexual organs of both characters, treated without concealment.

In the rest of the Spanish Renaissance artistic production, decorum and modesty predominated, golden rules of Spanish art that were elevated to art theory in treatises such as Vicente Carducho's Allegories of Painting, Francisco Pacheco's Art of Painting, or Jusepe Martínez's Practicable speeches. In this context, the nude human figure is only found in the religious sphere, especially in sculptural imagery, such as Alonso Berruguete's St. Sebastian (1526–1532), Juan de Juni's The Burial of Christ (1541–1545) or Juan Martínez Montañés' St. Jerome penitent (1598). The exceptions to this rule are very few, such as the fresco of the Story of Danae in the Royal Palace of El Pardo (1563), by Gaspar Becerra, with a Michelangelesque influence.

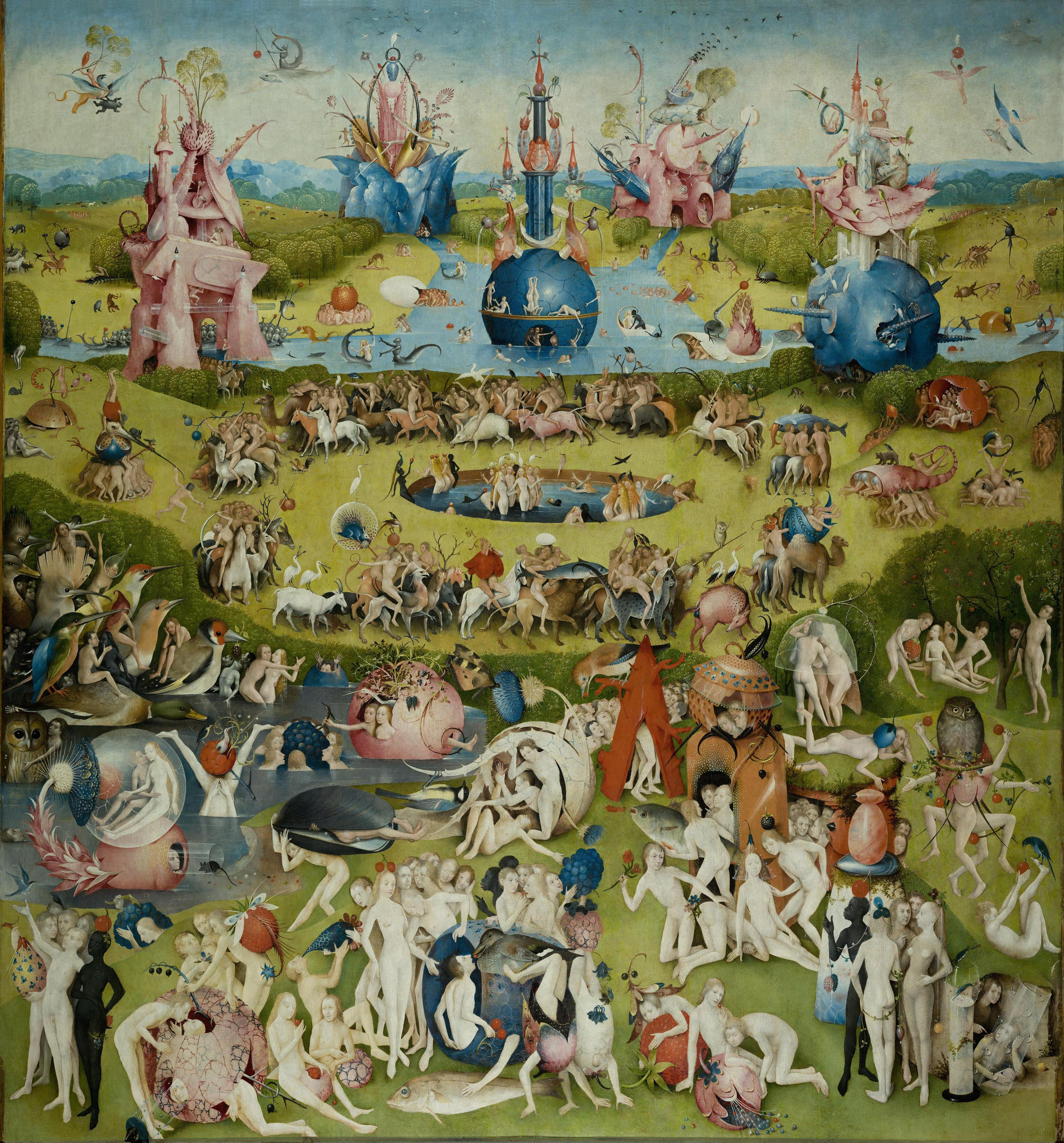
The Garden of Earthly Delights (1480–1490), Bosch, Museo del Prado, Madrid.

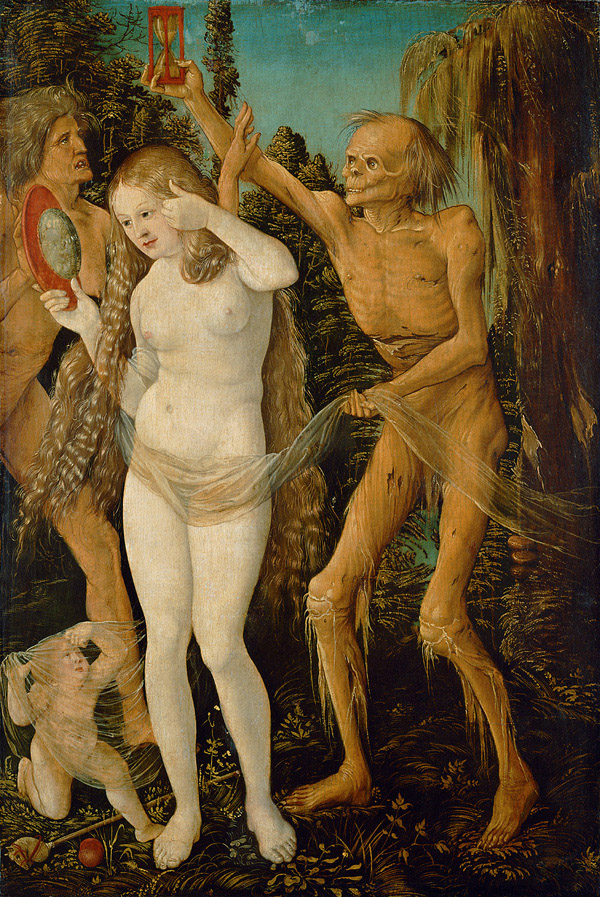
The Three Ages of Woman and Death (1510), by Hans Baldung, Kunsthistorisches Museum, Vienna.

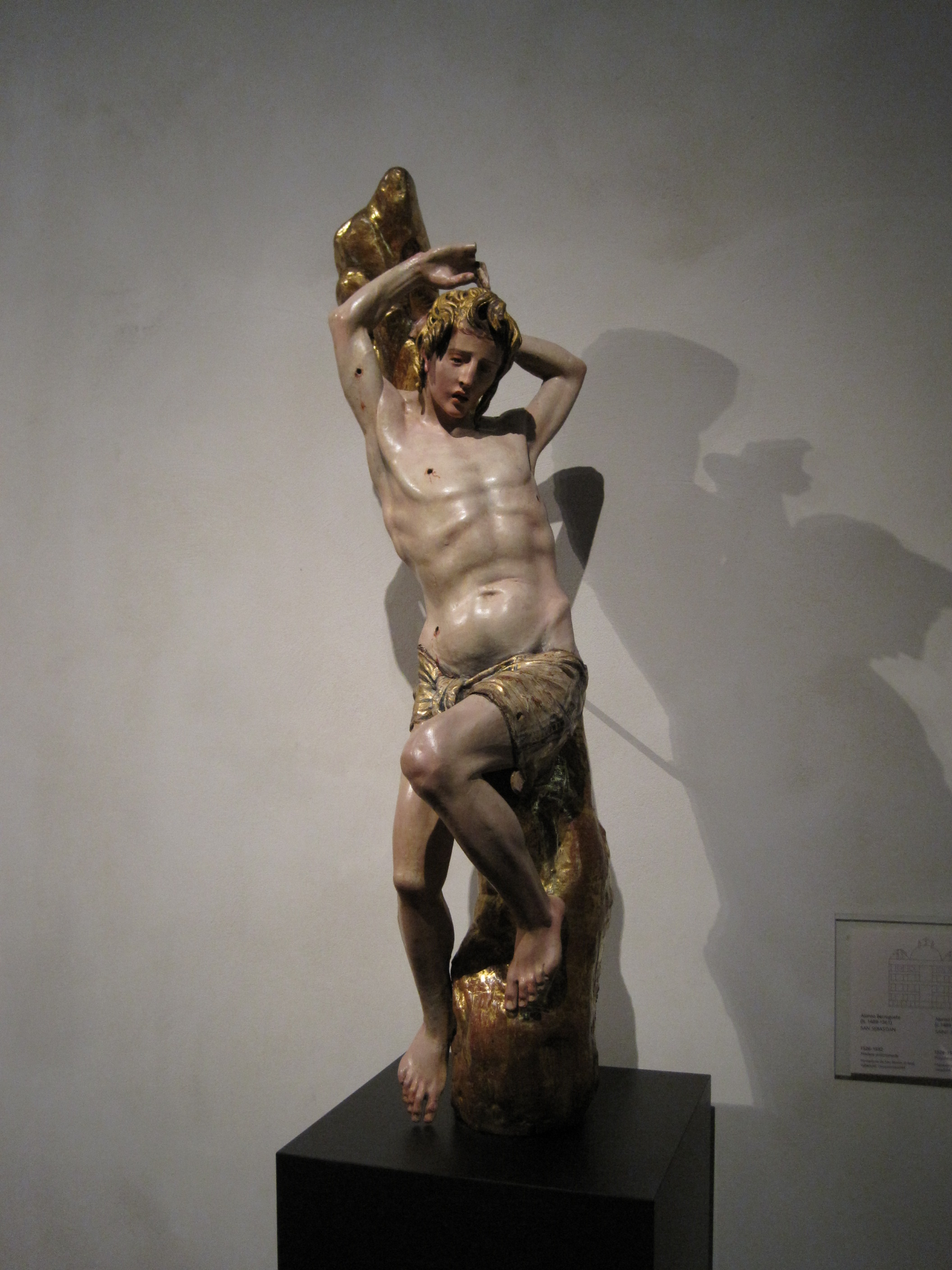
St. Sebastian (1526–1532), by Alonso Berruguete, Museo Nacional Colegio de San Gregorio, Valladolid.

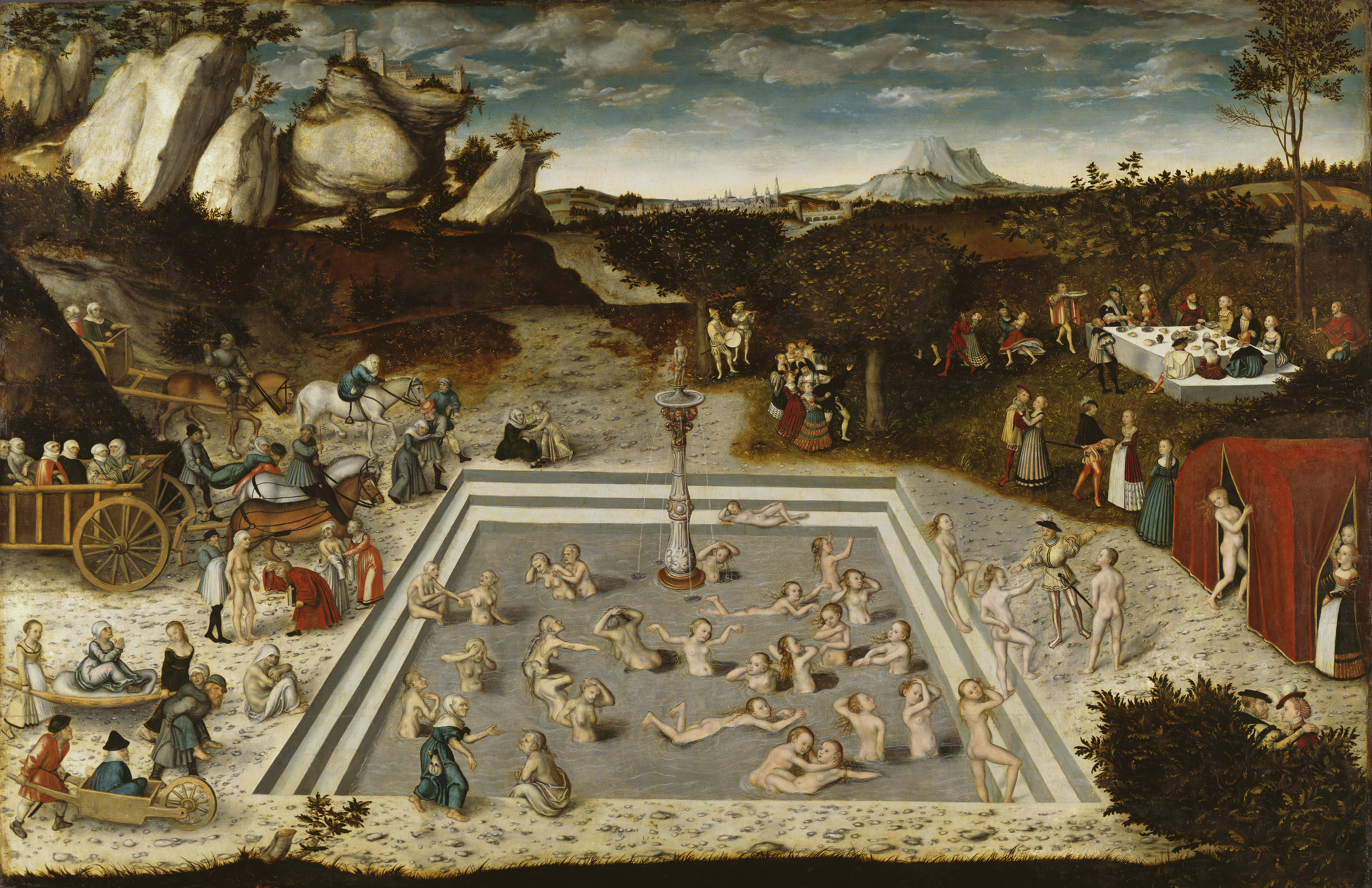
The Fountain of Youth (1546), by Lucas Cranach the Elder, Guemäldegalerie, Berlin.

Laocoön and his sons (1610–1614), El Greco, National Gallery of Art, Washington D.C.

=== Baroque ===
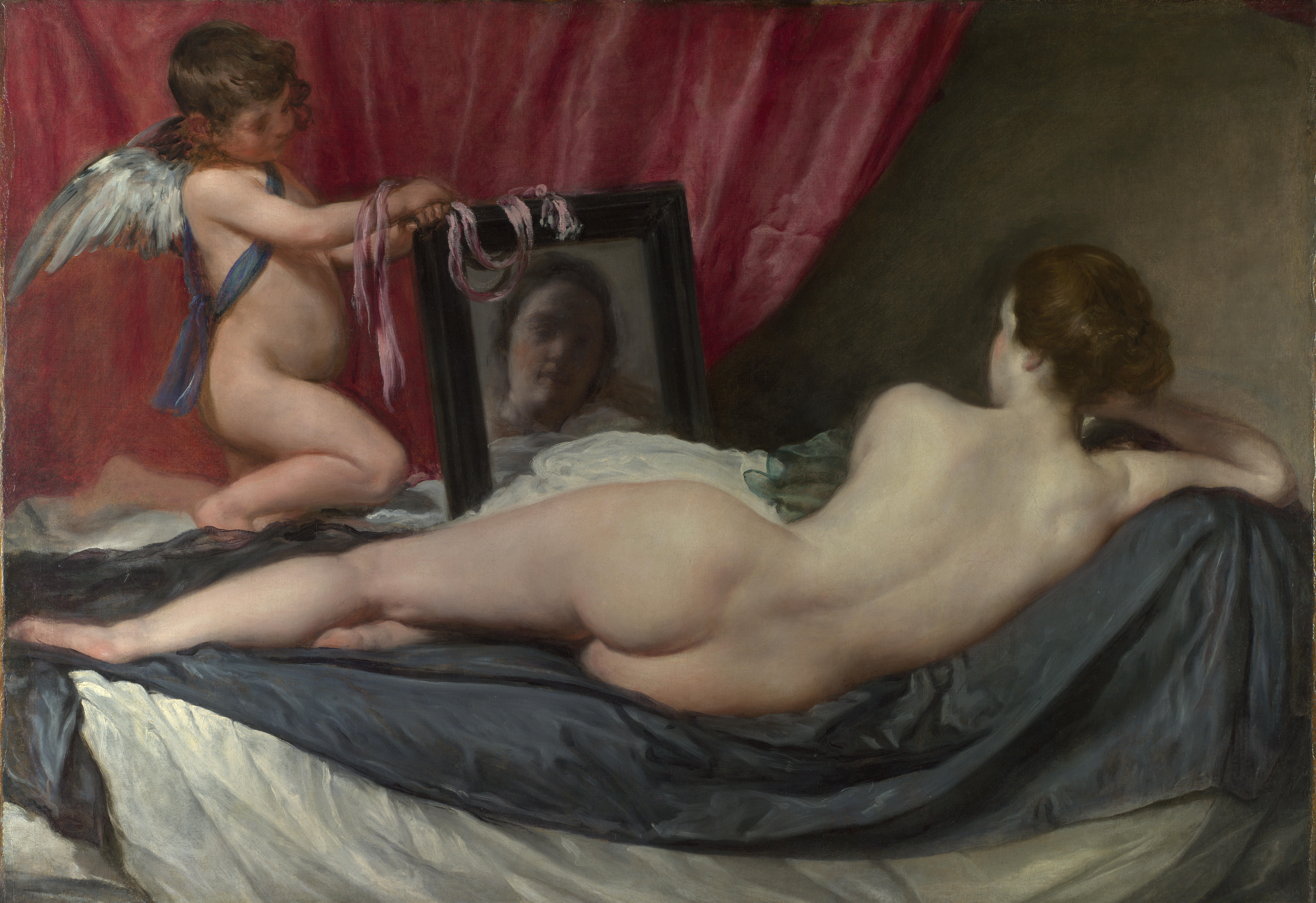
Venus at her Mirror (1647–1651), by Diego Velázquez, National Gallery, London.

The Baroque (Note: The term "baroque" comes from a word of Portuguese origin, where the pearls that had some deformity were called baroque pearls, being originally a derogatory word that designated a type of capricious, grandiloquent, excessively ornate art (Chilvers (2007, p. 83)).) developed between the 17th century and the beginning of the 18th century. It was a time of great disputes in the political and religious fields, with a division emerging between the Catholic counter-reformist countries, where the absolutist state and the Protestant countries (of a more parliamentary sign) ere strengthened. Art became more refined and ornate, retaining a certain classicist rationalism, but with more dynamic and dramatic forms, a taste for the surprising and the anecdotal, and for optical illusions and the blows of effect.

During the Baroque period, the female nude continued to predominate as an object of pleasure for aristocratic patrons, who enjoyed this type of composition, where women generally played a subordinate role to men. Along with the mythological theme, the custom of making allegorical portraits where naked women represented concepts such as Justice, Truth, Generosity, etc. began. The Baroque nude accentuated the effects of torsion and dynamism present in Mannerism and in the work of Michelangelo, from whom they took the spiral composition—which Michelangelo introduced in his Allegory of Victory in the Palazzo Vecchio in Florence, and which allowed a more solid base to support the weight of the torso. Thus, the classical "heroic diagonal" became the "heroic spiral", the way in which a violent and forced movement could express the dramatism and effectiveness of baroque art.

The Three Graces (1636–1639), by Peter Paul Rubens, Museo del Prado, Madrid.

The Baroque had as its main herald the nude Peter Paul Rubens, whose robust and carnally sensual female figures marked an epoch in the aesthetic concept of beauty of his time. However, despite this carnal exuberance, the work of Rubens—also the author of numerous religious works—does not lack a certain idealism. This natural purity gives his canvases a dreamy candor, an optimistic and integrating vision of man's relationship with nature. Rubens attached great importance to the design of his figures. For this, he studied in depth the work of previous artists, from whom he drew his best resources, especially concerning the nude, from Michelangelo, Titian, and Marcantonio Raimondi. He was a master in finding the precise tonality for the flesh tones of the skin—equaled only by Titian and Renoir—as well as its different textures and the multiple variants of the effects of brightness and the reflections of light on the flesh. He was also concerned with the body's movement and with giving weight and solidity to his figures. However, he did not neglect the psychological aspect and facial expression. In the faces of his figures, one can appreciate a carefree happiness, a certain pride in knowing they are beautiful, but without conceit, and a certain vital gratitude that the artist himself felt before the gifts of life. Among his works related to the nude are worth mentioning: The Death of Seneca (1611–1615), Venus, Cupid, Bacchus and Ceres (1612–1613), Cupid and Psyche (1612–1615), The Headdress of Venus (1615), Daniel in the Lions' Den (1615), Perseus and Andromeda (1622), The Arrival of Marie de Medici at Marseille (1622–1625), The Triumph of Truth (1622–1625), Minerva Protecting Peace from Mars (1629), Venus and Adonis (1635), The Three Graces (1636–1639, where are portrayed the two women of his life, Isabella Brandt and Hélène Fourment), The Rape of the Daughters of Leucippus (1636), The Birth of the Milky Way (1636–1638), Diana and Callisto (1637–1638), Diana and her nymphs surprised by the fauns (1639–1640), The Judgment of Paris (1639), etc.. Author of more than 2,000 paintings, he is perhaps the artist who has depicted the most nudes in history.

As for the religious theme, Rubens demonstrated the same synthesizing capacity as in his other nudes, giving his figures a physical entity that enhanced their spiritual aspect, as in his two works for the Antwerp Cathedral, The Elevation of the Cross (1611) and The Descent from the Cross (1613), which again show the Michelangelesque influence, as well as the assimilation of the undulating movement of Laocoön. In these images, the color of the flesh plays an essential role, contrasting the pale, pale figure of Christ with the intense color of the rest of the figures, which adds greater effect to the drama of the scene. The same effect appears in the Crucifixion (1620) of the Boymans Van Beuningen Museum, where the different chromatism of the figures of Christ and the thieves is added to the effect of the stormy light, while the differentiation in the anatomies of the different figures emphasizes the ideal physique of Jesus as opposed to the crude materiality of the thieves.

Disciples of Rubens were Anthony van Dyck and Jacob Jordaens: the first, a great portraitist, evolved towards a more personal style, with a strong Italian influence, as in his Pietà on Prado (1618–1620) and the Saint Sebastian of the Alte Pinakothek in Munich, or in Diana and Endymion surprised by a satyr (1622–1627) and The Duke and Duchess of Buckingham as Venus and Adonis (1620). Jordaens was more faithful to his master—without reaching his height—as evidenced by the proliferation of nudes almost comparable to those of the Antwerp genius: The Satyr and the Peasant (undated), The Rape of Europa (1615–1616), Fertility (1623), Pan and Syrinx (1625), Apollo and Marsyas (1625), Prometheus Bound (1640), The Daughters of Cecrops Finding Erichthonius (1640), The Triumph of Bacchus (1645), The Rest of Diana (1645–1655), The Abundance of the Earth (1649), etc.

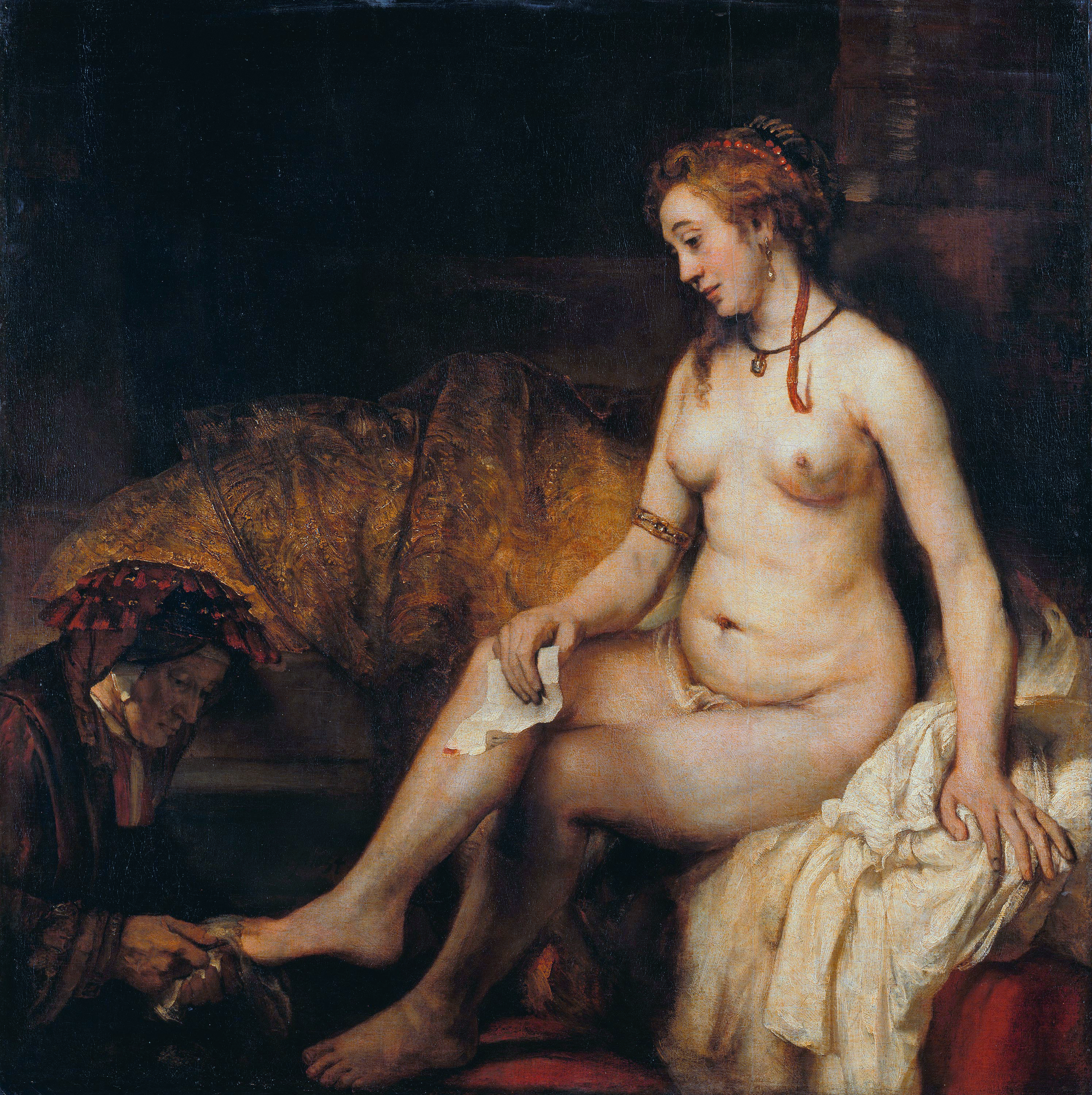
Bathsheba at the Bath (1654), by Rembrandt, Louvre Museum, Paris.

On the opposite side of Rubens' idealism is the work of Rembrandt, heir to the rounded forms of the Nordic nude of Gothic origin, with figures treated realistically, just as exuberant as those of Rubens, but more mundane, without hiding the folds of the flesh or the wrinkles of the skin, with a pathos that accentuates the raw materiality of the body, in its most humiliating and pitiful aspect. Rembrandt appeals to nature against the rules, moved by a defiant veristic honesty, and perhaps by a feeling of compassion towards the less favored creatures of society: older men, prostitutes, drunks, beggars, and the disabled. For him, imbued with a biblical sense of Christianity, poverty and ugliness were inherent in nature, and as worthy of attention as wealth and beauty. This revelatory sense of imperfection is evident in works such as Diana at the Bath (1631), Naked Woman Sitting on a Mound (1631), Cleopatra (1637), Woman Bathing Her Feet at a Brook (1658), etc. Nor did he mind showing the crudest of human anatomy in The Anatomy Lesson of Dr. Nicolaes Tulp (1632). More pleasing are Susanna and the Elders (1634), Adam and Eve in Paradise (1638), Bacchante contemplated by a faun and Danae receiving the golden rain (1636–1647, where he portrayed his wife, Saskia van Uylenburgh). An attempt to show perhaps sensual beauty was his Bathsheba at the Bath (1654), where he depicts her lover, Hendrickje Stoffels, which despite its rounded and generous forms, shown with honesty, manages to convey a feeling of nobility, not ideal, but sublime, while his meditative expression provides inner life to the carnal figure, and gives it a spiritual aura, reflecting the Christian concept of the body as a receptacle of the soul.

In Italy the work of Gian Lorenzo Bernini, architect and sculptor who staged the pomp of papal Rome in a sumptuous and grandiloquent way, and whose works express the dynamic and sinuous movement so characteristic of the Baroque, as denoted in his main sculptural groups: Aeneas, Anchises and Ascanius fleeing Troy (1618–1619), The Rape of Proserpina (1621–1622), David throwing his sling (1623–1624), Truth Unveiled by Time (1645–1652) and Apollo and Daphne (1622–1625), where his mastery of modeling, the drama of the action, his daring foreshortenings and his decorative sense, often captured in floating vestments of fragile balance, are manifested. Another great creator was Caravaggio, who initiated a style known as naturalism or caravagism, based on strict natural reality and characterized by the use of chiaroscuro (tenebrism) to achieve dramatic and surprising effects thanks to the interaction between light and shadow. Eccentric and provocative artist, among his works stand out: Saint John the Baptist (Youth with a Ram) (1602), Victorious Cupid (1602–1603), The Entombment of Christ (1602–1604), The Flagellation of Christ (1607), Christ at the Column (1607), Saint Jerome Writing (1608), The Raising of Lazarus (1609), etc. His followers were Giovanni Battista Caracciolo (The Young St. John in the Desert, 1610–1620; Sleeping Cupid, 1616; Martyrdom of St. Sebastian, 1625) and Artemisia Gentileschi (Susanna and the Elders, 1610; Danae, 1612; Cleopatra, 1621; Joseph and Potiphar's Wife, 1622; Sleeping Venus, 1625–30).

Between Italy and France, another current, classicism, originated, equally realistic but with a more intellectual, idealized concept of reality, and in which the mythological theme evoked a world of perfection and harmony, comparable to the Roman Arcadia. It began in the Bolognese School, by the hand of Annibale Carracci, whose Triumph of Bacchus and Ariadne (1597–1602) presents a procession full of nudes, which also abound in the decoration that the artist made in the Farnese Palace in Rome. In Corpse of Christ (1583–1585), he was inspired by Mantegna's work of the same name. Another member of the school was Guido Reni, who produced numerous mythological allegories and paintings of gods and heroes whose nudity highlights their dignity and magnificence, as in Atalanta and Hippomenes (1612), Samson drinking from the jawbone of an ass (1611–1612) and Rape of Deianira (1620–1621). Francesco Albani sought in mythology a graceful and amiable subject matter to which he was naturally inclined, as in his series of the Seasons (1616–1617, which includes Winter or The Triumph of Diana, Autumn or Venus and Adonis, Spring or Venus in her toilette and Summer or Venus at Vulcan's Forge), Unarmed Loves (1621–1633), Mercury and Apollo (1623–1625), Diana and Actaeon (1625–1630) and Allegory of Water (1627). Guido Cagnacci was one of the last representatives of the school, exporting classicism to the Germanic sphere: Allegory of Human Life, The Death of Cleopatra (1658), St. Jerome (1659), Mary Magdalene Unconscious (1665).

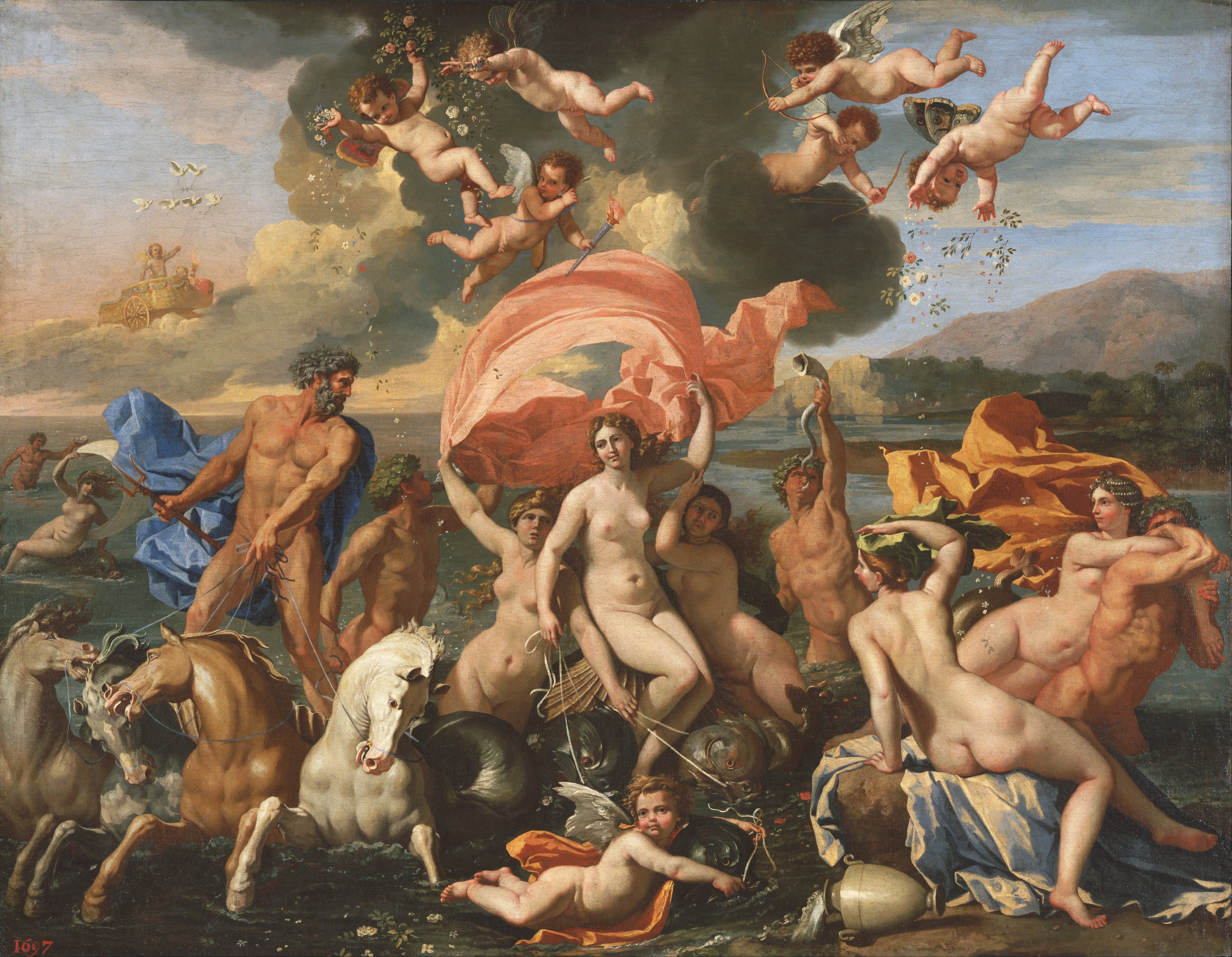
The Triumph of Galatea (1635), by Nicolas Poussin, Philadelphia Museum of Art.

In the French field, Nicolas Poussin, an artist of serene classicism, was perhaps the inaugurator of the academic nude, for being cultured and idealized, based on the representation of erudite culture in images, with mythology and ancient history as its thematic base. Of Raphaelesque influence, he was interested in anatomy, elaborating all his works conscientiously, conceived in both a plastic and an intellectual sense. He was interested in archaeology, inaugurating with Claude Lorrain the so-called "historical landscape", where a landscape frame is used to place various historical or mythological figures, along with architecture or ruins of antiquity. His works include: Apollo and Daphne (1625), Apollo and Bacchus (1627), Echo and Narcissus (1628), Parnassus (1630), Cephalus and Aurora (1630), Midas and Bacchus (1630), The Empire of Flora (1631), The Triumph of Galatea (1634), Bacchanal (1634–1635), Adoration of the Golden Calf (1636), Venus and Aeneas (1639), etc. Other classicist-inspired artists were: Simon Vouet (Cupid and Psyche, 1626; Sleeping Venus, 1630–1640), Charles Le Brun (Death of Meleager, 1658; The Labors of Hercules, 1658–1661) and Jacques Blanchard (Angelica and Medoro, 1630; Danae, 1630–1633; Venus and the Three Graces surprised by a mortal, 1631–1633).

In the "full baroque" (second half of the seventeenth century), decorative and ornate style, with a predilection for optical effects (trompe-l'oeil) and luxurious and exuberant scenography, many artists worked on the decoration of the Palace of Versailles. This style spread to the rest of France. The nude developed notably in sculpture, filling squares and gardens throughout France, with artists such as Pierre Puget (Milon of Crotona, 1671–1682; Perseus and Andromeda, 1685) and François Girardon (Apollo tended by the nymphs, 1666; The Rape of Proserpina, 1677). He also excelled in the field of applied arts, especially in bronze and porcelain, and even carving and stewing in cabinetmaking.

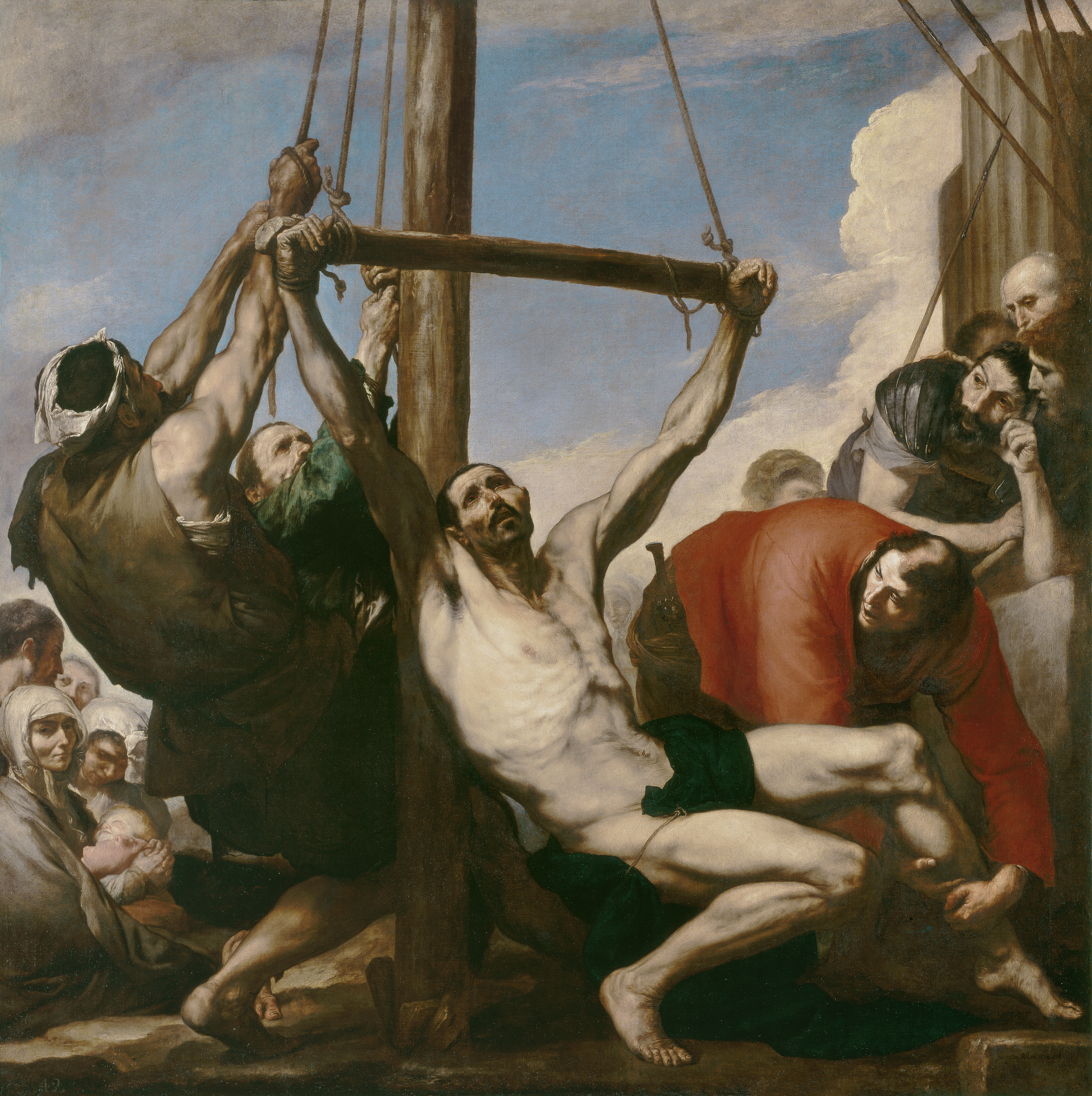
The Martyrdom of Saint Philip (1639), by Jusepe de Ribera, Museo del Prado, Madrid.

Spain remained an artistically chaste and demure country at this time, where the nude was viewed with modesty. Thus, an artist like Bartolomé Esteban Murillo only shows nude figures in the infantile forms that populate his scenes of the Virgin, with her child Jesus and her putti, her little angels that play and fly everywhere in the sacred space of his works. However, at this time, a certain openness began, and a man of the Church, like Friar Juan Rizi, justified the nude human figure in his Treatise on Wise Painting, which he studied in detail, accompanied by numerous illustrations in his own handwriting. It should also be noted that the Hispanic monarchs were great collectors of nudes, from Charles V to Philip IV, and for this purpose was intended the Golden Tower of the Royal Alcazar of Madrid, once a real museum of the nude.

The nude in Spain continued to be predominantly of religious theme, as can be seen in the work of Francisco Ribalta, Jusepe de Ribera, Francisco de Zurbarán, Gregorio Fernández, and Pedro de Mena. Some exceptions can be seen in Ribera—perhaps due to his stay in Italy—such as his Drunken Silenus (1626), his Apollo and Marsyas (1637) or his images of Ixion (1632) and Prometheus (1630), or in the Christ's Descent into Limbo (1646–1652) by Alonso Cano. Zurbarán also painted some pictures of Hercules for the Torre de la Parada, commissioned by Velázquez.

But undoubtedly the great genius of the Spanish Baroque was Diego Velázquez, painter to Philip IV, whose magnificent production is one of the milestones in the history of art. Velázquez enjoyed great freedom in his work, undoubtedly because of his position as royal painter, so he was able to paint more nudes than any other Spanish artist of his time. Even so, he was constrained by clerical censorship, so he had to change the iconographic sense of some of his works, which went from mythological nudes to genre or costumbrist scenes: thus, what would have been a bacchanal with a Dionysian theme became The Drinkers (1628–1629), and the adultery of Mars and Venus became Vulcan's Forge (1630). He had less problems—logically—in his religious representations, such as his Christ Crucified (1639), or in Christ after the flagellation (1632) and Joseph's Tunic (1630), where the nude has a clear classicist, almost academic component, a fact that is demonstrated in the anatomical conception of certain figures, although they later appear dressed, as in the case of The Spinners (1657), where the Michelangelesque influence of the Sistine Chapel is evident.

However, the Sevillian painter was able to explore himself with the Venus at her Mirror (1647–1651), one of the most famous nudes in history. It is a nude of great originality, especially for being presented from behind, a fact not very common at the time, and whose conception shows the influence of the Borghese Hermaphrodite, which Velázquez knew in Italy. On the other hand, the attitude of Venus, who looks at herself in the mirror, represents an allegory of vanity. The painter made other nudes—now lost—such as a Cupid and Psyche and a Venus and Adonis that belonged to Philip IV, a female nude owned by Domingo Guerra Coronel, and a reclining Venus that was in the possession of the painter himself at his death.

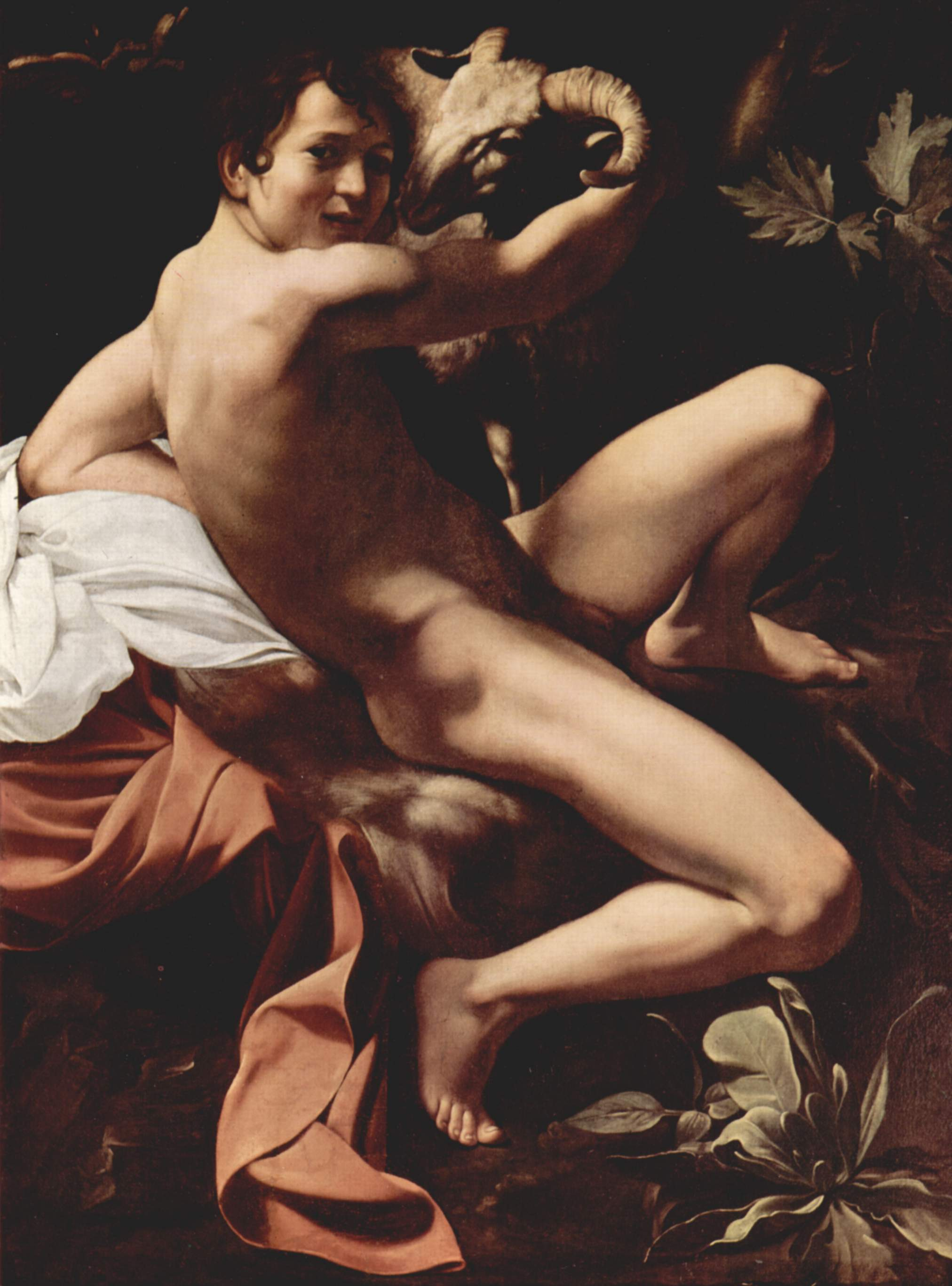
Saint John the Baptist (Youth with a Ram) (1602), by Caravaggio, Capitoline Museums, Rome.

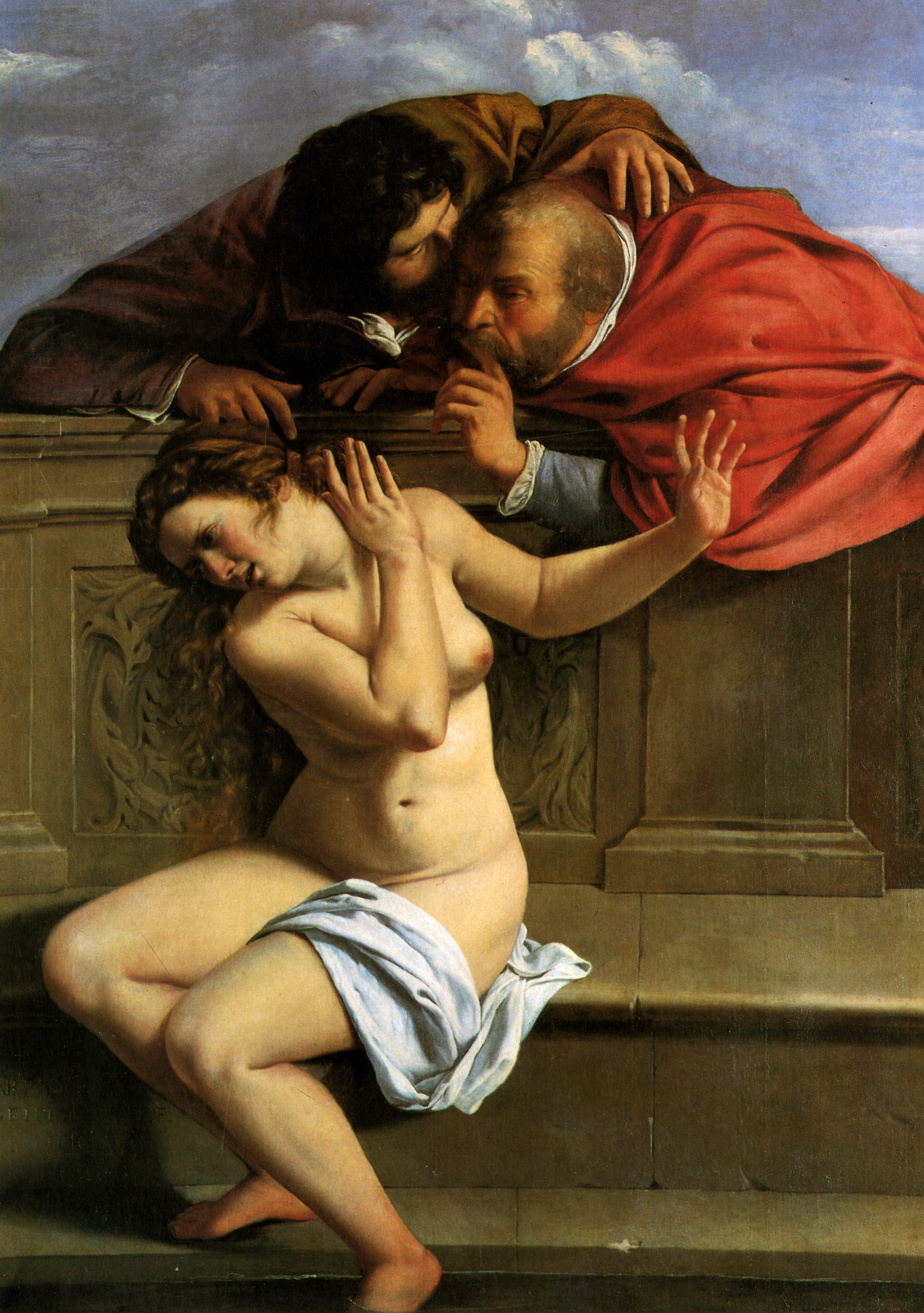
Susanna and the Elders (1610), by Artemisia Gentileschi, Weissenstein Castle, Pommersfelden.

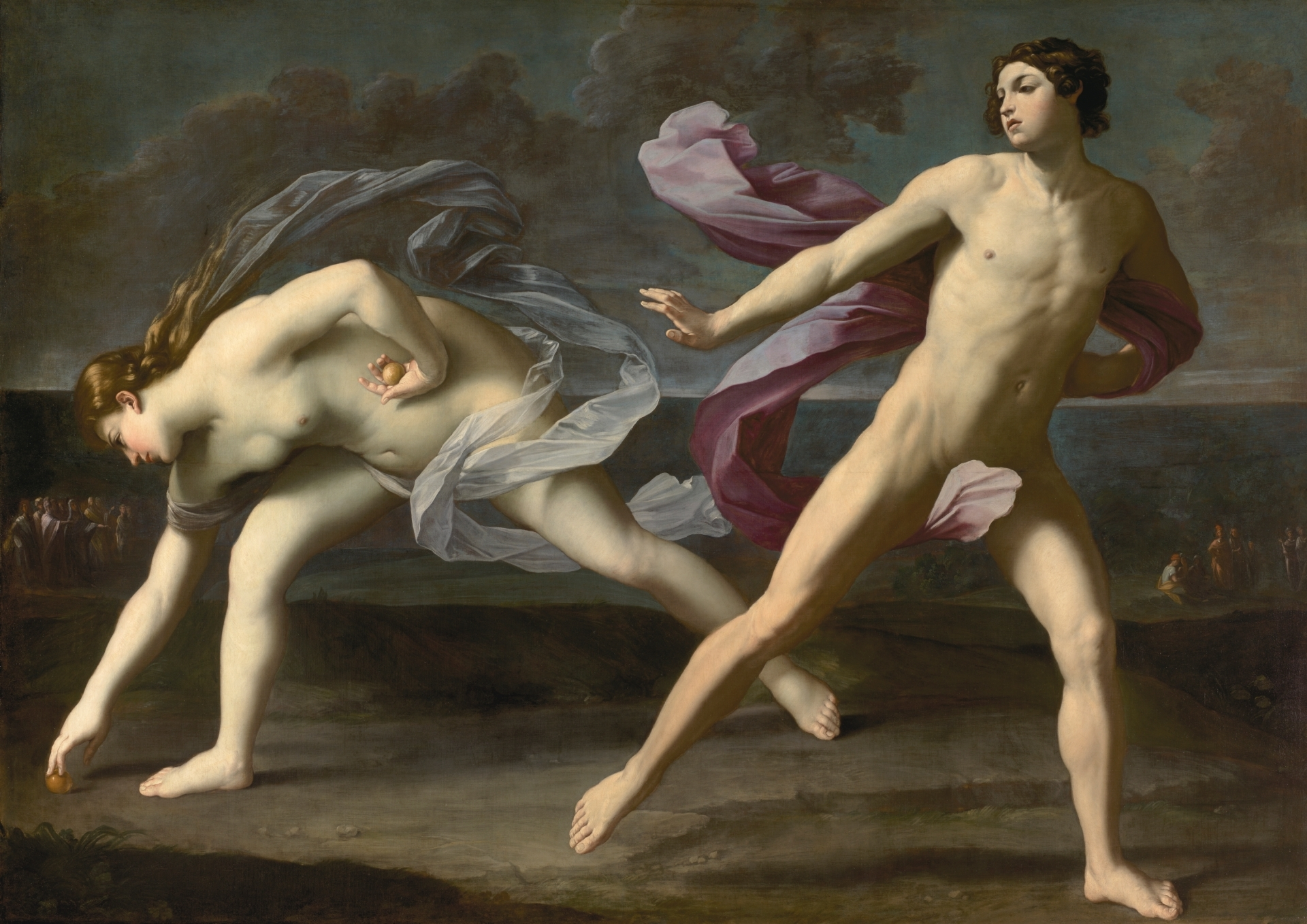
Atalanta and Hippomenes (1612), by Guido Reni, Museo del Prado, Madrid.

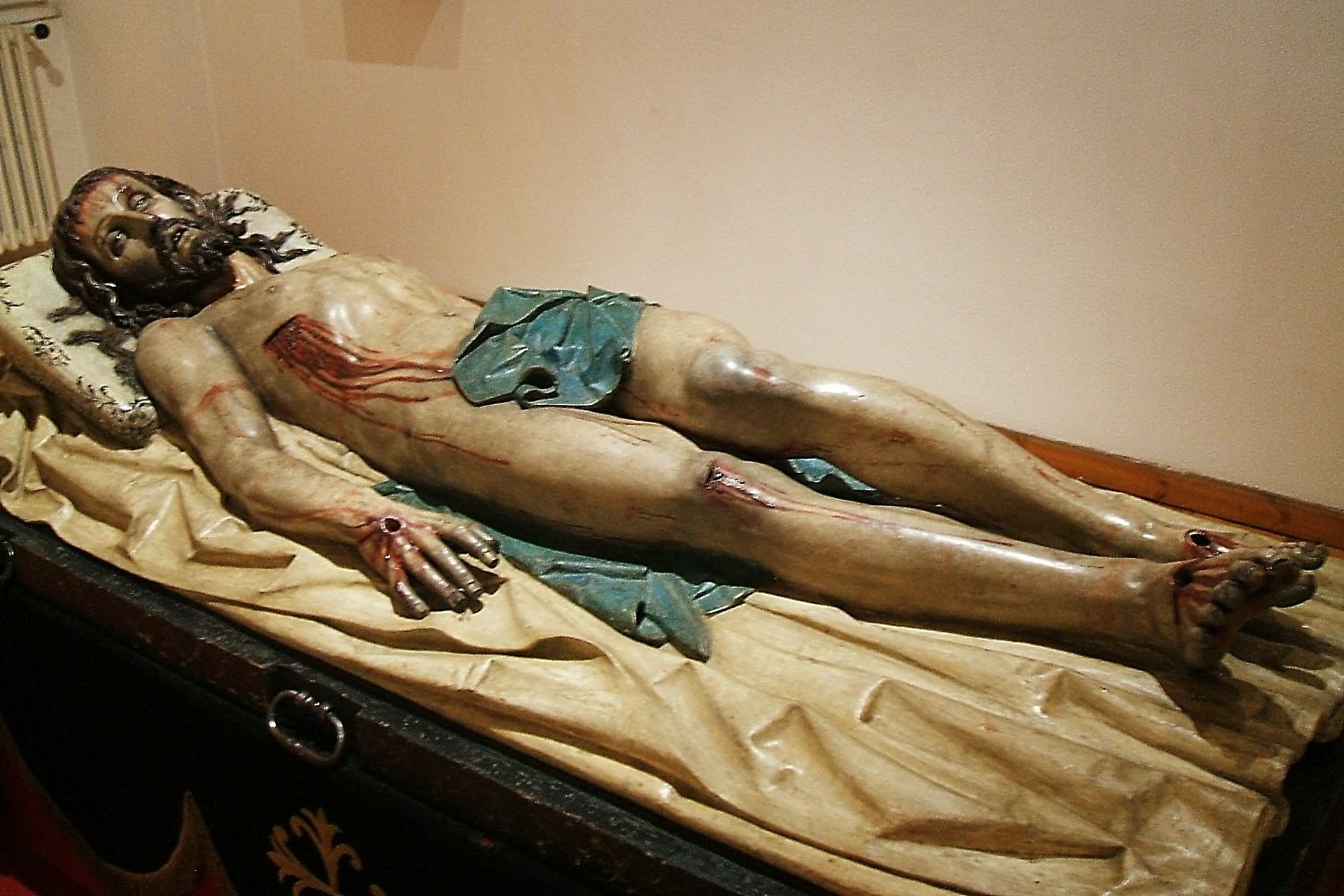
Recumbent Christ (1634), by Gregorio Fernández, Museum of the Royal Monastery of San Joaquín and Santa Ana, Valladolid.

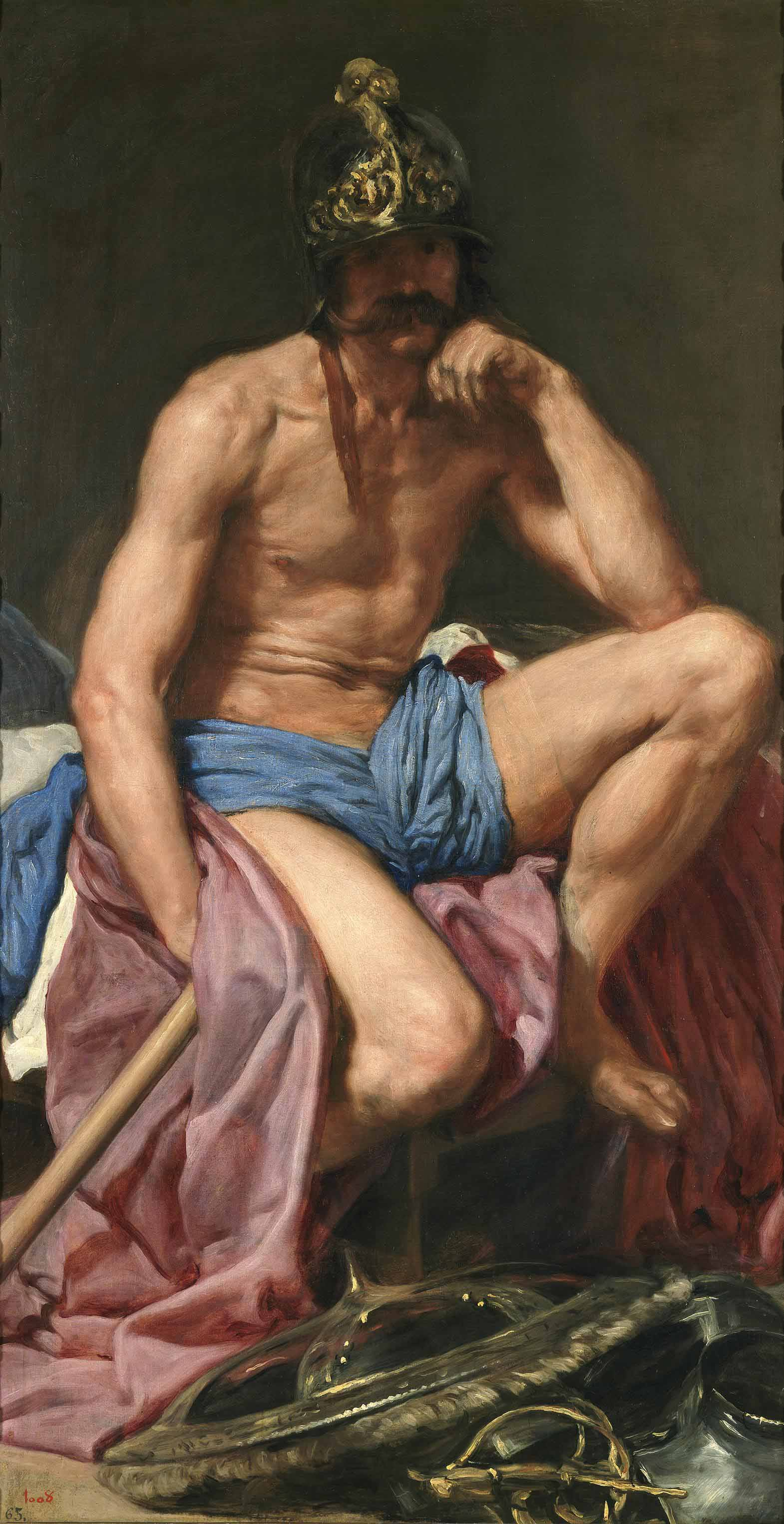
Mars Resting (1640), by Diego Velázquez, Museo del Prado, Madrid.

=== Rococo ===
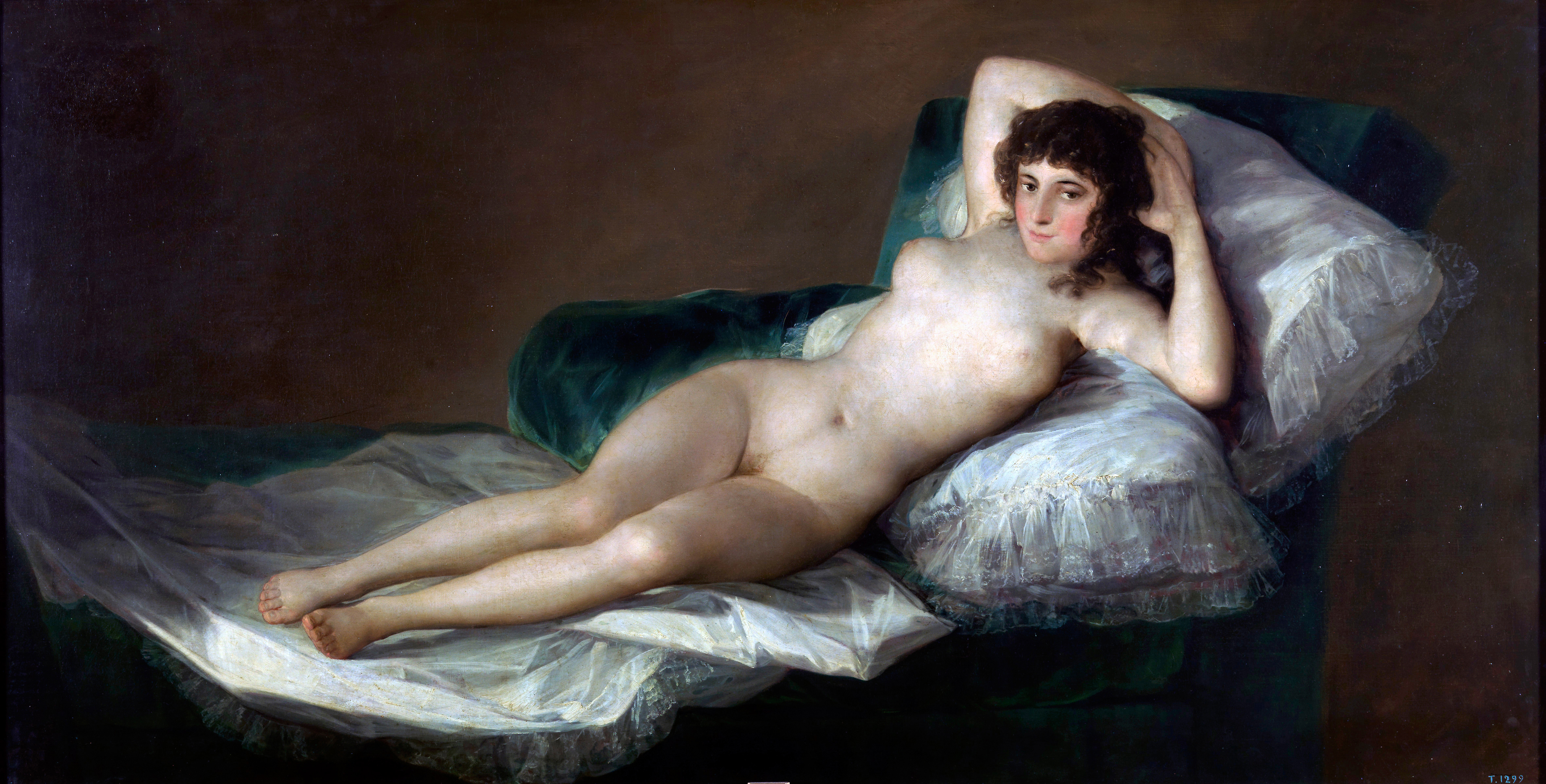
La maja desnuda (1797–1800), by Francisco Goya, Museo del Prado, Madrid.

Developed in the 18th century—in coexistence at the beginning of the century with the Baroque, and at the end with Neoclassicism— (Note: Rococo emerged in France during the regency of the Duke of Orleans, during the minority of Louis XV, and survived during his reign. The term rococo was formed by combining the Italian barocco and rocaille, a decorative element similar to a shell, widely used in ornamentation during this period. (Chilvers (2007, p. 818))) it meant the survival of the main artistic manifestations of the Baroque, with a more pronounced sense of decoration and ornamental taste, taken to a paroxysm of richness, sophistication, and elegance. The progressive social rise of the bourgeoisie and scientific advances, as well as the cultural environment of the Enlightenment, led to the abandonment of religious themes in favor of new themes and more worldly attitudes, highlighting luxury and ostentation as new factors of social prestige.

The nude at this time was heir to Rubens—from whom they took especially the color and texture of the skin—and had greater erotic connotations, of a refined and courtly eroticism, subtle and evocative, but not without provocation and a certain irreverent character, abandoning any hint of classicist idealization and assuming the mundane character of the genre. In France, where it developed more fully, a Gothic air that had not completely abandoned French art during the Renaissance survives in its figures, which are reflected in elongated forms, small breasts, and prominent stomachs. In the middle of the century, the type of small, slender figure (the petite) became more popular, as can be seen in the pictorial work of Boucher (Diana Resting after her Bath) or the sculptural work of Clodion (Nymph and satyr, Girl playing with her dog). It also began to represent the nude from behind, until then considered more lewd and little represented, except on rare occasions, as the famous Venus at her mirror by Velazquez, having examples such as The Judgment of Paris by Watteau or the Resting Girl by Boucher.

Jean-Antoine Watteau was one of the initiators of the style, with his scenes of gallant parties and bucolic landscapes full of mythical characters or, when not, anonymous people enjoying life. Influenced by Rubens and the Venetian school, his palette was brightly colored, with a nervous style of rapid, expressive, and vibrant brushstrokes. His nudes are scarce, but they are true masterpieces, elaborated with care and great elegance: in addition to The Judgment of Paris (1718–1721) it is worth remembering Fountain Nymph (1708), Unarmed Love (1715), Jupiter and Antiope (1715–1716), Diana in the Bath (1715–1716) and Spring (1716). Watteau's followers were several artists who followed the master's gallant style: François Lemoyne (Hercules and Omphale, 1724), Charles-Joseph Natoire (Psyche in her toilette, 1735) and Jean François de Troy (The Bath of Diana and her Nymphs, 1722–1724; Susanna and the Elders, 1727).

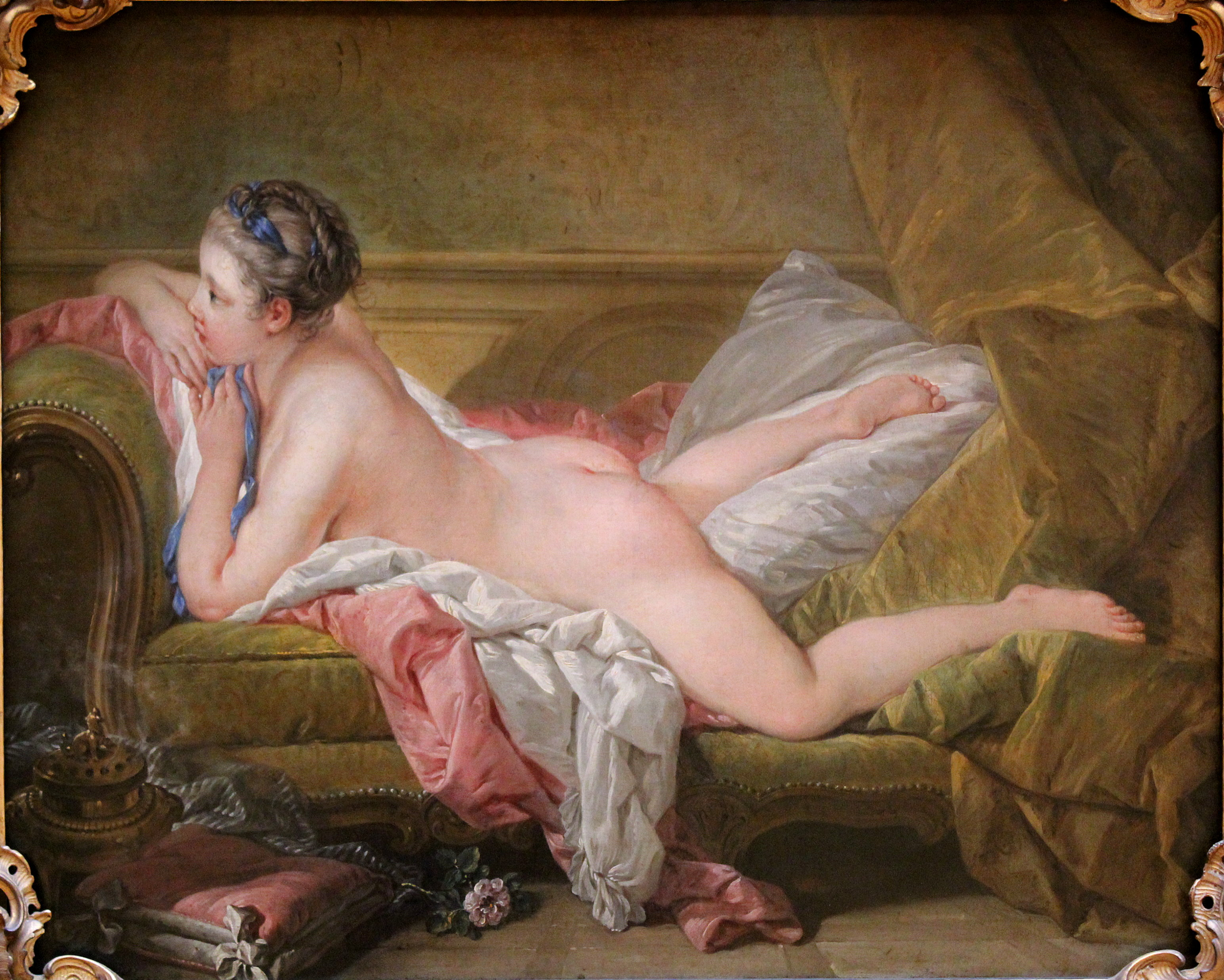
Resting Girl (portrait of Mademoiselle Marie-Louise O'Murphy) (1751), by François Boucher, Alte Pinakothek, Munich.

François Boucher mastered perspective to perfection, learned from the Baroque masters, and masterfully recreated the coloring of Rubens and Correggio, in works that touched all genres, from history and portraiture to landscape and genre paintings. His images have a bucolic and pastoral air, often inspired by Ovidian mythology, with a gallant and courtly sense that made him a fashionable painter, academic, and first painter to the king. Among his works, in addition to the Resting Girl (portrait of Marie-Louise O'Murphy, mistress of Louis XV, and the youngest of five sisters all of whom Boucher painted), stand out: The Triumph of Venus (1740), Leda and the Swan (1742), Diana Resting after her Bath (1742), La toilette de Venus (1751), etc.

His disciple was Jean-Honoré Fragonard, who continued the courtly style where gallant love displays all its charms, with a fine eroticism of graceful and elegant cut. He was a protégé of Madame du Barry, for whom he produced the cycle of The Progress of Love in the Hearts of Young Women (1771–1773), composed of five large panneaux: The Meeting, The Pursuit, The Love Letters, The Satisfied Lover and The Abandonment. Other works of his are: The Birth of Venus (1753–1755), The Shift Withdrawn (1761–1765), The Bathers (1765), Girl with a Dog (La gimblette) (1768), The Fountain of Love (1785), and The Two Girlfriends, with a lesbian theme, more markedly erotic.

In the field of sculpture, there were also notable nudes, in which the Rococo's roguish and gallant tone is combined with a certain classicist air—inherited from the French statuary of the 17th century—and the interest in portraiture. Some of the best exponents are: Jean-Baptiste Lemoyne (Nymph leaving the bath), Edmé Bouchardon (Cupid making a bow from the mace of Hercules, 1750), Jean-Baptiste Pigalle (Mercury attaching his winged sandals, 1744; Venus, 1748; Voltaire, 1770–1776), Étienne Maurice Falconet (Milon of Crotona, 1754; Madame de Pompadour as Venus, 1757; Pygmalion and Galatea, 1763), Jean-Antoine Houdon (Morpheus, 1770; Diana the Huntress, 1776; Allegory of Winter, 1783), Augustin Pajou (Psyche Abandoned, 1790) and Clodion (The Rhine River Separating the Waters, 1765; Triumph of Galatea, 1779).

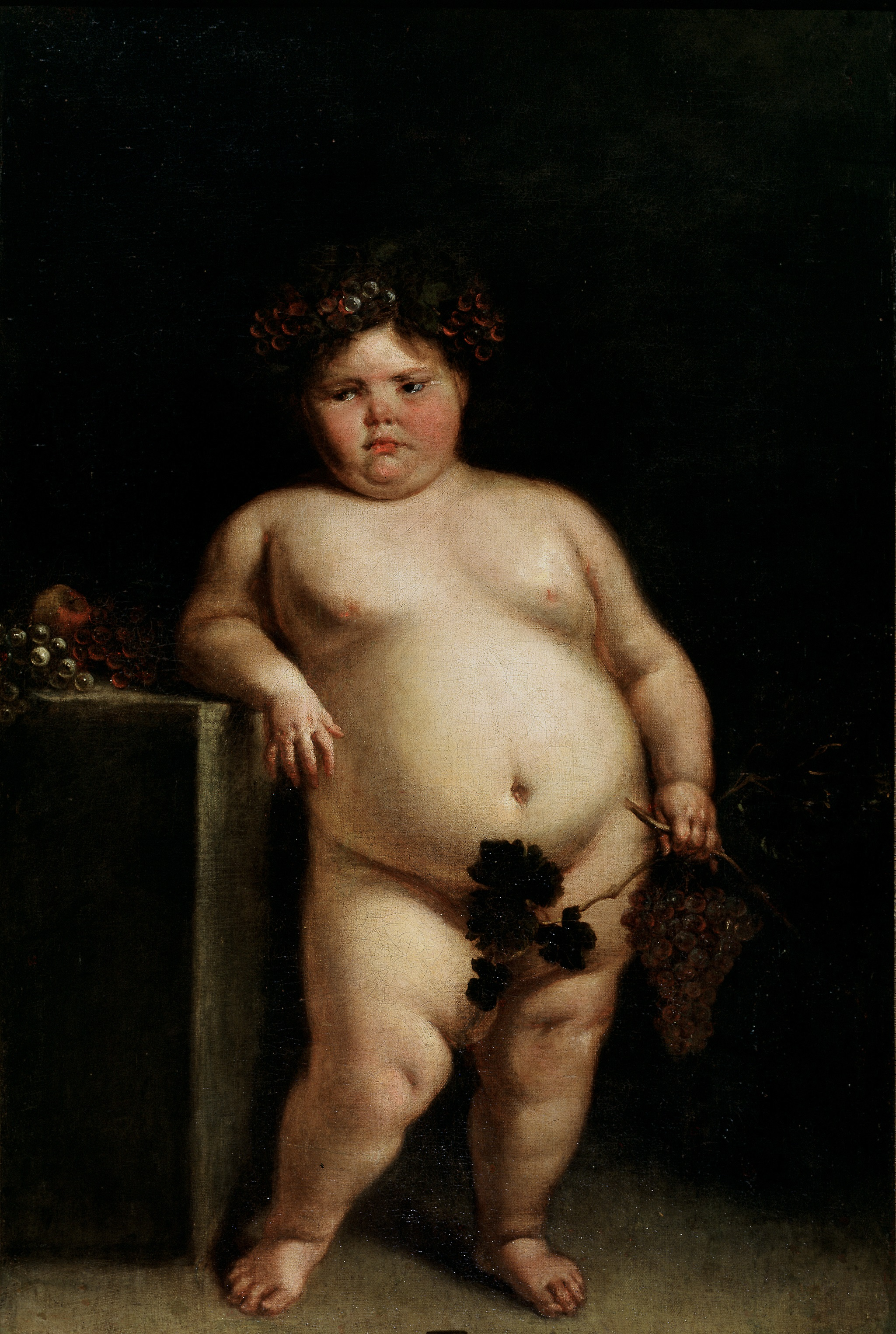
The Naked Monster (1680), by Juan Carreño de Miranda, Museo del Prado, Madrid.

Outside France, in many parts of Europe, the baroque survived until the middle of the 18th century, being replaced or intermingled with the growing exuberance of the rococo. A clear example of the survival of the Baroque is The Naked Monster (1680), by Juan Carreño de Miranda. Giambattista Tiepolo was a follower of the Venetian school, with its rich colors, clear skies, diaphanous landscapes, majestic architecture, and a certain scenographic air that gives his work a great magnificence. His works abound in allegories and historical and mythological themes, full of gods and naked heroes, such as Diana discovers Calisto's pregnancy (1720–1722). Corrado Giaquinto, despite being a predominantly religious painter, also painted allegories and mythological works featuring naked figures, such as Peace, Justice and Hercules. In Spain, he decorated the ceiling of the Hall of Columns in the Royal Palace of Madrid with multiple figures of nude gods (Apollo, Bacchus, Venus, Diana). The German Anton Raphael Mengs already pointed to neoclassicism, seeking to synthesize Michelangelo's drawing with Raphael's colorfulness and Correggio's chiaroscuro, always with the cult of Antiquity as a backdrop. Established in Spain, as director of the Royal Academy of Fine Arts of San Fernando, he advocated the study of the natural for the representation of the nude. In his decoration of the Gasparini Hall of the Royal Palace of Madrid (1765–1769), he displayed an authentic Olympus of gods and classical heroes, such as the scenes of Hercules led before Jupiter, Triumph of Trajan, Jupiter, Venus and the Graces, The Aurora, etc. In Germany, the sculptors Georg Raphael Donner (Atalanta) and Franz Ignaz Günther (Cronos, 1765–1770) also stood out.

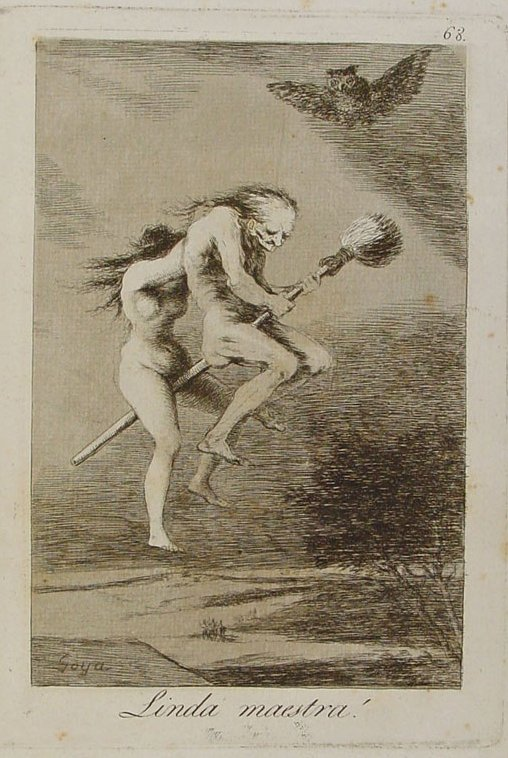
Linda maestra (1799), Capricho no. 68, by Francisco Goya.

An artist difficult to classify was Francisco Goya, an unsurpassed genius who evolved from Rococo to an expressionism of romantic spirit, but with a personality that gives his work a unique character, unparalleled in the history of art. His masterpiece in the nude genre is La maja desnuda (1797–1800), which he painted in parallel to La maja vestida (1802–1805), and which is one of the first nudes where pubic hair is clearly visible. It is one of the first cases of nudity not justified by any historical, mythological or religious theme, simply a naked woman, anonymous, (Note: It is not known for sure who was the model used by Goya, the possibilities of the Duchess of Alba or Pepita Tudó, lover and later wife of Manuel Godoy are being considered; in any case, Goya's intention was not to portray someone specific, but an anonymous woman, one like any other. (Bozal, Valeriano (1989). "Goya. Entre Neoclasicismo y Romanticismo" (in Spanish). Madrid: Historia 16: 146.)) whom we see in her intimacy, with a certain air of voyeurism. It is a proud, almost defiant nudity, the maja looks directly at us, with a mischievous, playful air, offering the sinuous beauty of her body to the delight of the viewer. Other nudes of the Aragonese genius in his early days are: Pietà (1774), Christ Crucified (1780), Psyche and Cupid (1798–1805), and Bandit stripping a woman (1798–1800). Later, due to his deafness, personal misfortunes, the weariness of court life, the horror of war, exile, loneliness, old age, and other factors, were influencing his personality and his work, which became more expressive, more introspective, with a strong satirical vein and an uglier aesthetic, highlighting the harshest and cruellest features of both people and the world around him. At this time, his nudes have a more dramatic character, sometimes pathetic, with deformed, rough bodies, as in The Witches' Kitchen (1797–1798), The Beheading (1800–1805), The Madhouse (1812–1819), The Bonfire (1812–1813) or the atrocious Saturn Devouring His Son (1819–1823). He then devoted himself more to engraving, a medium that allowed him to capture in an ideal way his tormented interior: in series such as Los desastres de la guerra (1810–1815) there are several nudes—although generally of corpses—as in Se aprovechan, Esto es peor and ¡Grande hazaña! ¡Con muertos!; or in Los caprichos (1799), where he undresses witches and other similar beings, as in ¡Miren qué graves!, Se repulen, ¡Quién lo creyera!, Sopla, Aguarda que te unten, Si amanece, nos vamos, Linda maestra, Allá va eso, ¿Dónde va mamá?, etc.

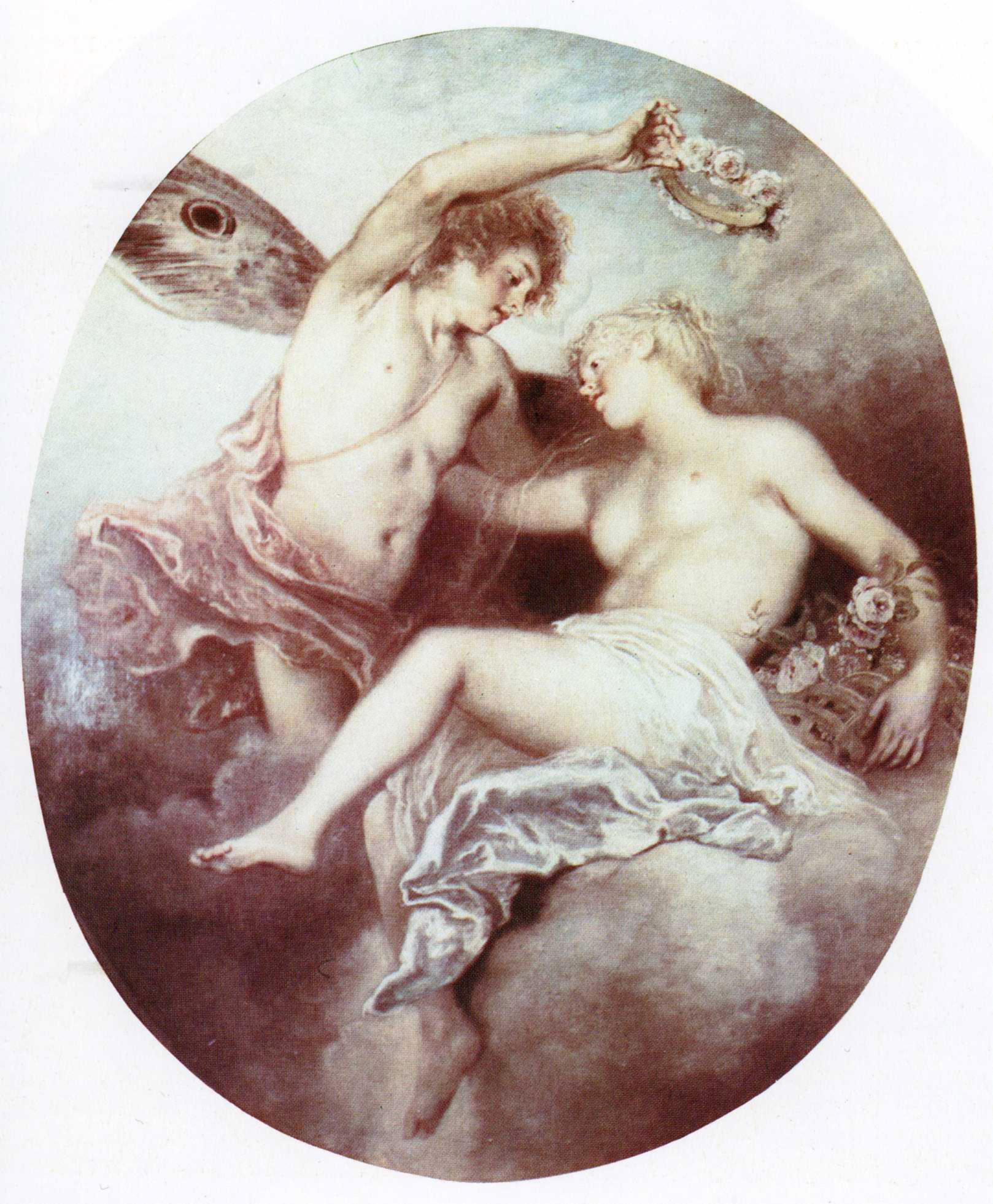
The Spring (1716), by Jean-Antoine Watteau, destroyed.

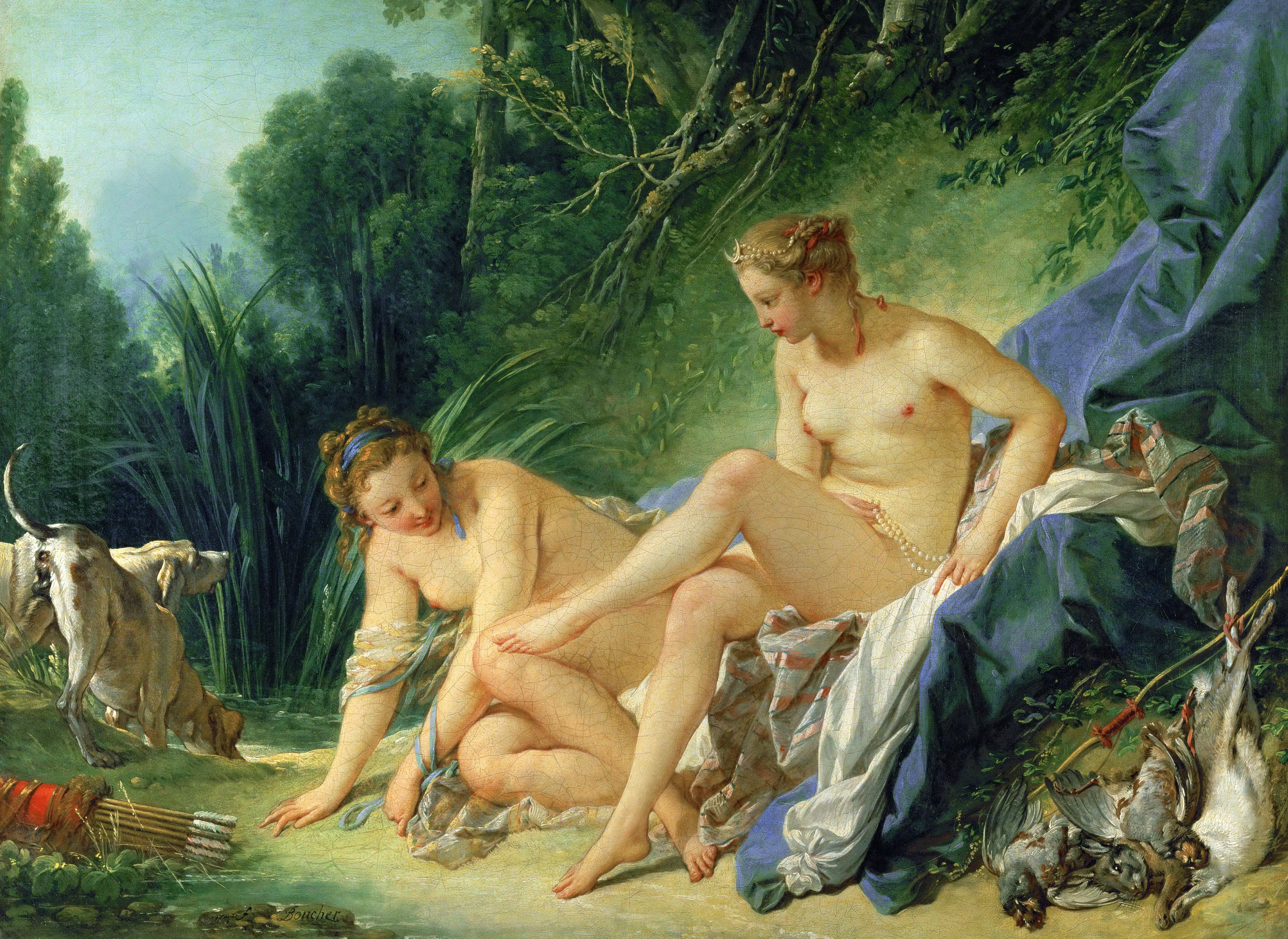
Diana Resting after her Bath (1742), by François Boucher, Louvre Museum, Paris.

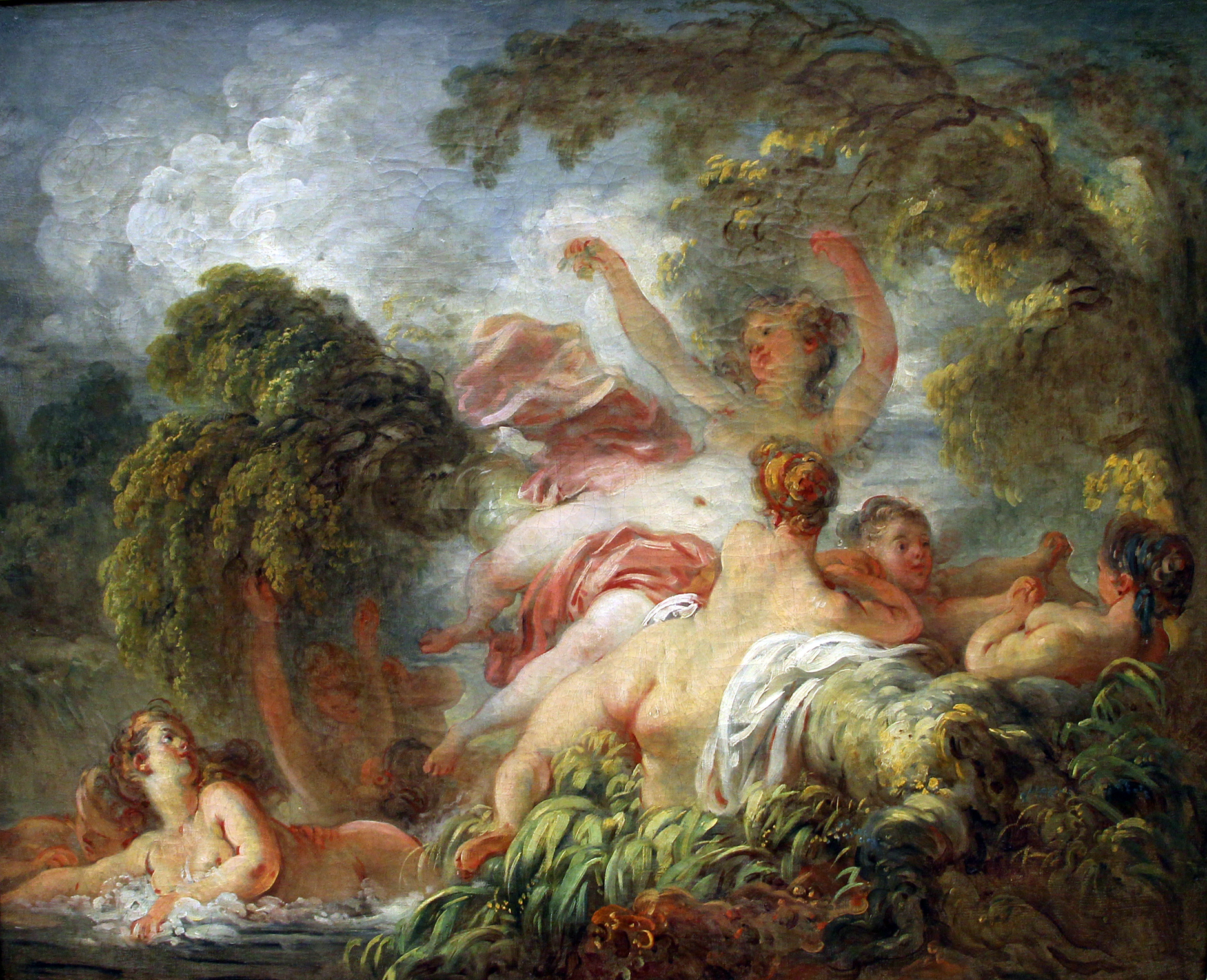
The Bathers (1765), by Jean-Honoré Fragonard, Musée du Louvre, Paris.

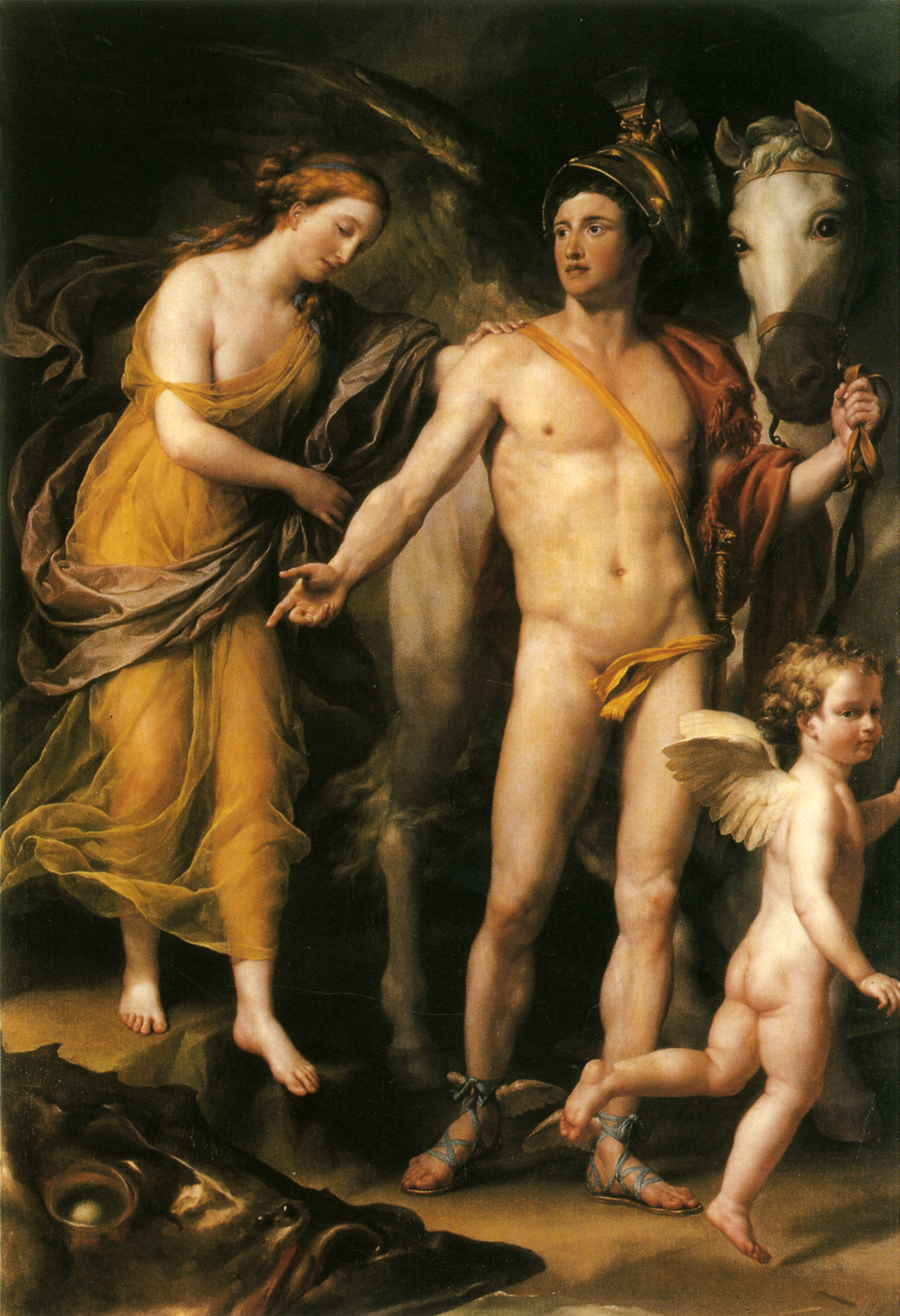
Perseus and Andromeda (1773–1776), by Anton Raphael Mengs, Hermitage, Saint Petersburg.

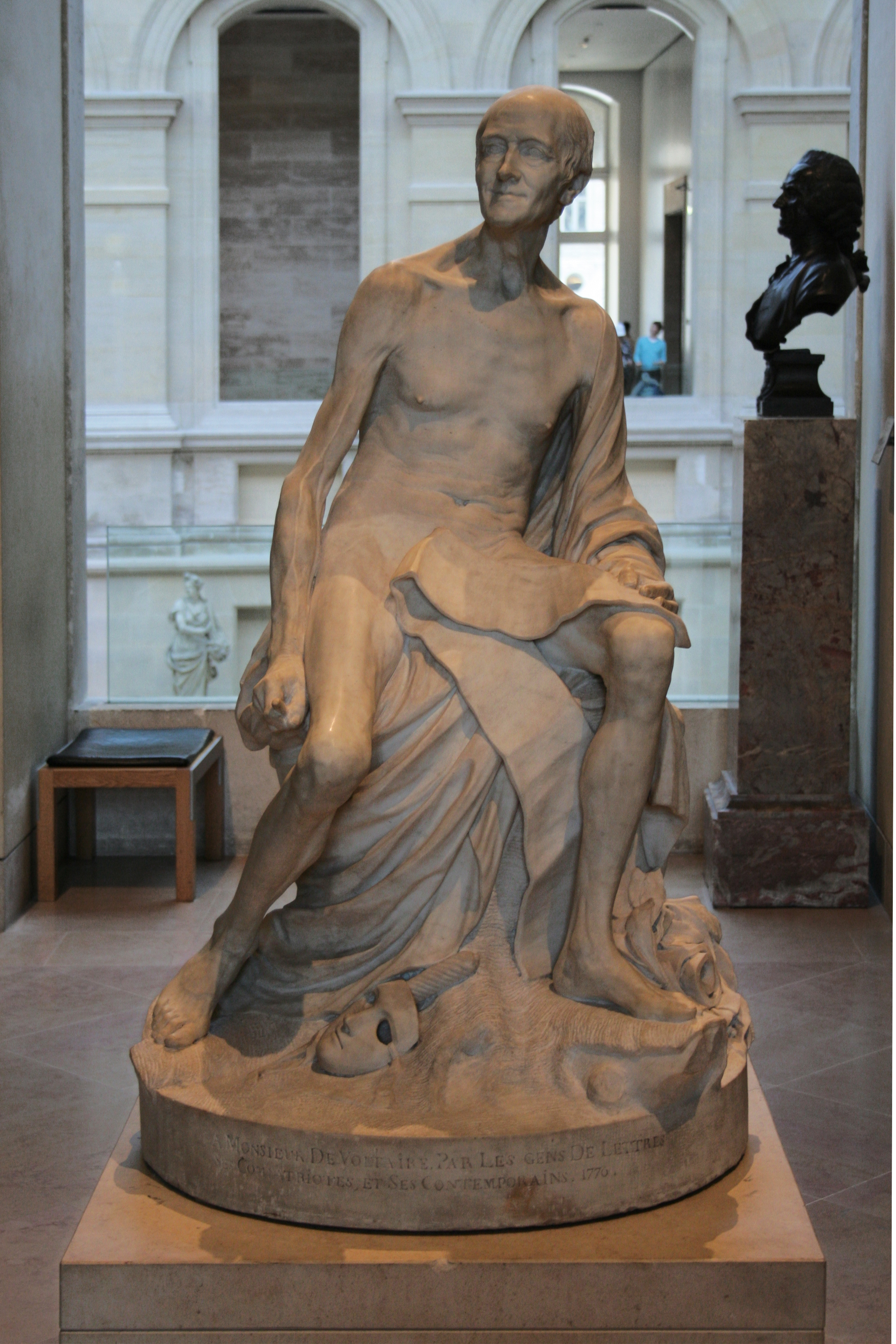
Voltaire (1776), by Jean-Baptiste Pigalle, Musée du Louvre, Paris.

=== Neoclassicism ===
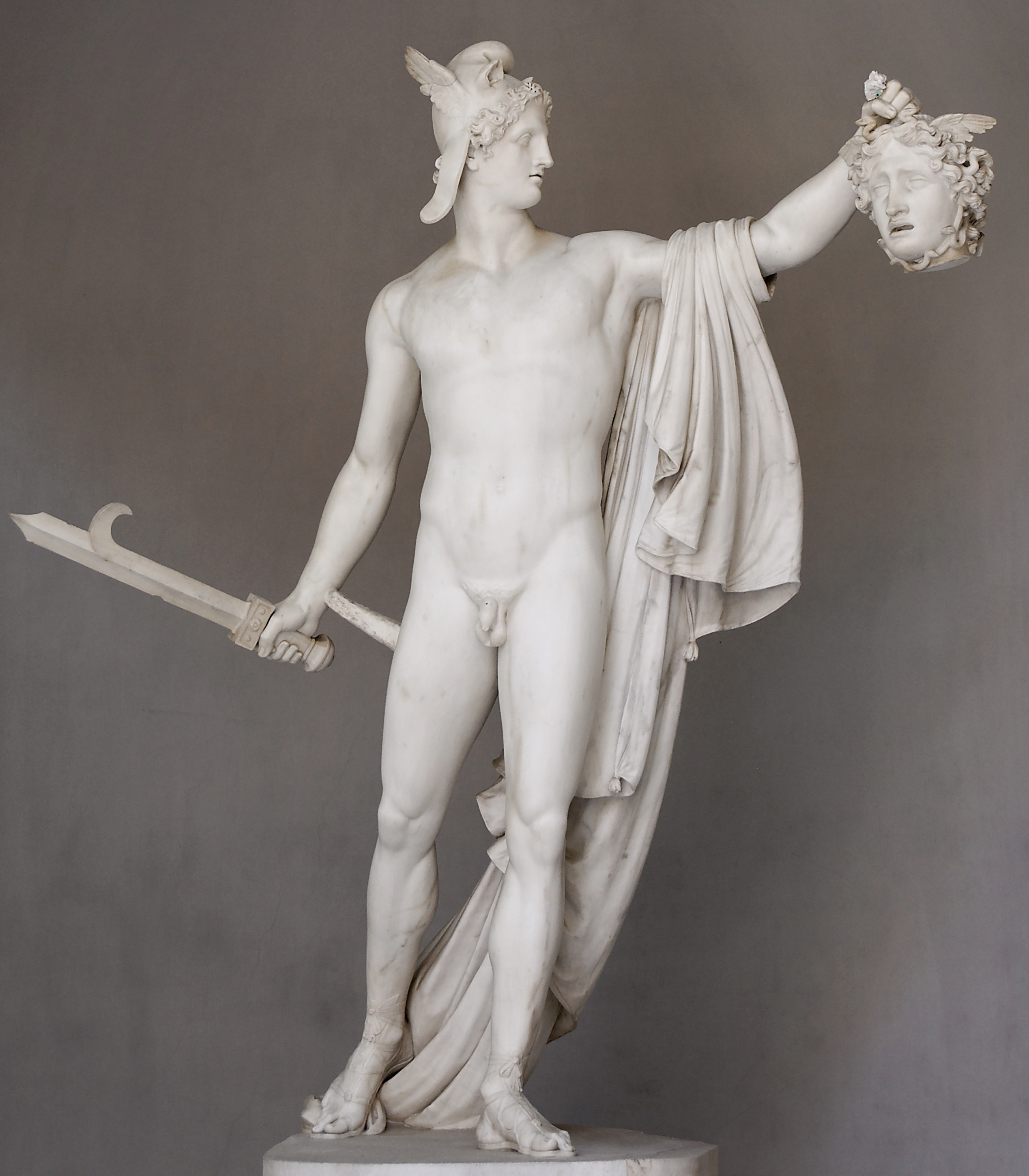
Perseus with the Head of Medusa (1800), by Antonio Canova, Vatican Museums.

The rise of the bourgeoisie after the French Revolution favored the resurgence of classical forms, more pure and austere, as opposed to the ornamental excesses of the Baroque and Rococo, which were identified with the aristocracy. This atmosphere of appreciation of the classical Greco-Roman legacy was influenced by the archaeological discovery of Pompeii and Herculaneum, together with the dissemination of an ideology of perfection of classical forms by Johann Joachim Winckelmann, who postulated that in Ancient Greece there was perfect beauty, generating a myth about the perfection of classical beauty that still conditions the perception of art today. (Note: In Reflection on the Imitation of Greek Works of Art (1755), Johann Joachim Winckelmann stated that the Greeks reached a state of total perfection in the imitation of nature, so that we can only imitate the Greeks. He also related art to the stages of human life (childhood, maturity, old age), establishing an evolution of art in three styles: archaic, classical, and Hellenistic (Bozal (2000, pp. 150–154)).)

The neoclassical nude recovered the forms of Greco-Roman antiquity, but devoid of its spirit, of its ideal character, of its exemplary ethos, to recreate itself only in pure form, detached from life, which ultimately resulted in a cold and dispassionate art, which would be prolonged in academicism with a sense of almost repetitive recurrence, in which the study of the classics prevented the artist's own personal expression. The avant-garde spirit of art fought this fact since impressionism, the first rupturist movement. In the artists of this period—such as Girodet and Prud'hon—a curious mixture of classicism and a certain mannerist air can be perceived—especially due to the influence of Correggio—which produced works that, although they wanted to revive the old classicism, were decontextualized and timeless.

Jacques-Louis David was the main driving force of neoclassicism, with an apparently academic style but passionate and brilliant, and with an intellectual sobriety that does not prevent beautiful, colorful execution. A politician as well as a painter, his defense of neoclassicism made him the aesthetic current of revolutionary and Napoleonic France. Between 1775 and 1780, he lived in Rome, where he was inspired by ancient statuary, Raphael, and Poussin, who led him to classicism, with a severe and balanced style of great technical purity. Among his works stand out: The Loves of Paris and Helen (1788), The Death of Marat (1793), The Intervention of the Sabine Women (1799), Leonidas at Thermopylae (1814), Cupid and Psyche (1817), Mars Being Disarmed by Venus (1824), etc.

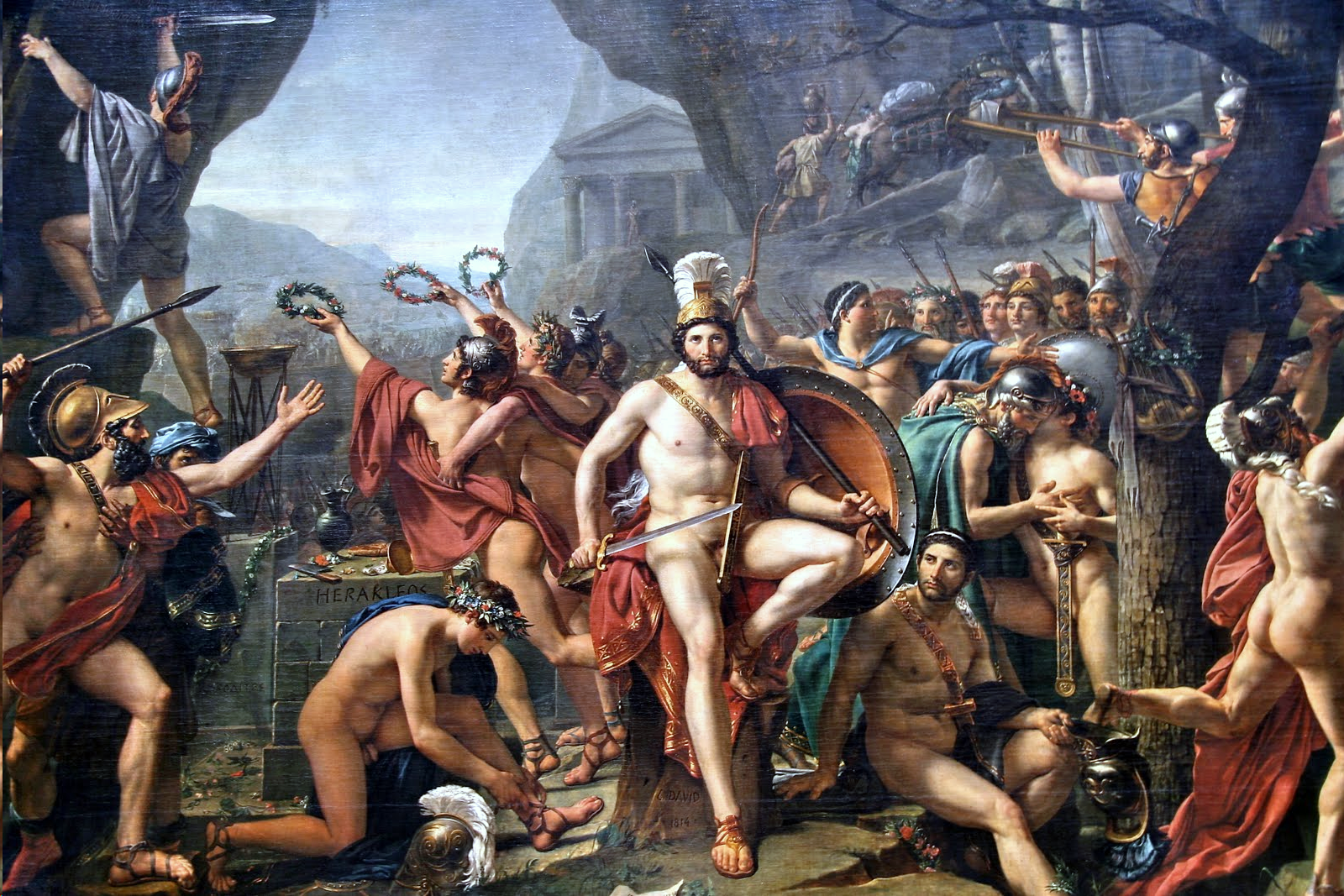
Leonidas at Thermopylae (1814), by Jacques-Louis David, Louvre Museum, Paris.

David's disciples and followers followed his classical ideal, but moving away from his rigorous severity and drifting towards a certain sensualist mannerism, with an erotic grace that Max Friedländer called volupté décente ("decent voluptuousness"). François Gérard sought the perfection of ideal beauty, through the softness of color and the cerulean texture of the skin, with marbled bodies, but soft, with a syrupy sweetness. His most famous work is Psyche and Amor (1798), which, despite its academic craftsmanship, its chromatic richness gives it an emotion of refined lyrical evocation. Pierre-Narcisse Guérin also cultivated a refined eroticism, influenced by Correggio, as in Aurora and Cephalus (1810) and Iris and Morpheus (1811). Jean-Baptiste Regnault cultivated a classicist line close to the Bolognese School: The Genius of France between Liberty and Death (1795), where the genius recalls the Mercury of Raphael's Vatican Stanzas. Other disciples of David were Jean Broc (The Death of Hyacinthos, 1801) and Jean-Louis-Cesar Lair (The torture of Prometheus, 1819). On the other hand, Anne-Louis Girodet de Roussy-Trioson broke with David's moral classicism, especially with her main work, The Sleep of Endymion (1791), with elongated and pearly bodies, with a certain sexual ambiguity, in a somewhat vaporous atmosphere reminiscent of Italian mannerism and preludes art pompier. Other works of his were: Mademoiselle Lange as Venus (1798) and Mademoiselle Lange as Danae (1799). Pierre-Paul Prud'hon was somewhere between rococo and neoclassicism—David disparagingly called him "the Boucher of his time"—and there are still those who describe him as a romantic. He was trained in Rome, where he was influenced by Leonardo and Correggio, who, together with classical art, were the basis of his style and gave him his own personality, which is why he is a painter difficult to classify. Among his works it is worth remembering Justice and Divine Vengeance Pursuing Crime (1808), The Abduction of Psyche by Zephyr (1800) and Venus and Adonis (1810).

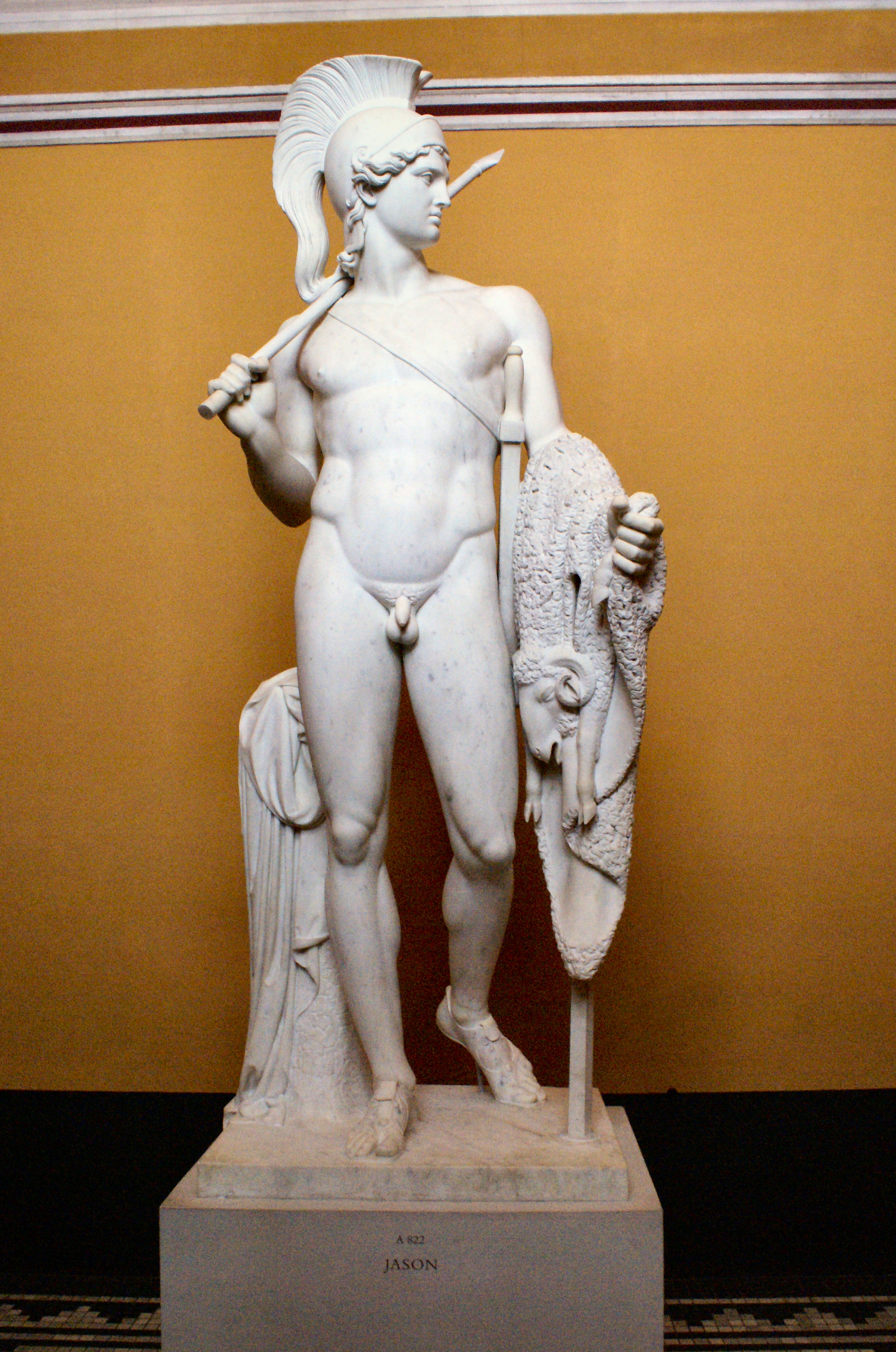
Jason with the Golden Fleece (1803), by Bertel Thorvaldsen, Thorvaldsen Museum, Copenhagen.

If David was the great neoclassical painter par excellence, in sculpture, his equivalent was Antonio Canova. Although he studied the work of the great Renaissance masters (Ghiberti, Donatello, Michelangelo), he found inspiration in classical Greco-Roman statuary, which he could study in the great collections of his native Italy. Thus, his work has the serenity and harmony of the purest classicism, while not failing to show human sensitivity and a decorative air typical of his Italian ancestry. His works include: Daedalus and Icarus (1777–1779), Theseus and the Minotaur (1781–1783), Psyche Revived by Cupid's Kiss (1786–1793), Venus and Adonis (1789–1794), Hercules and Lichas (1795–1815), Perseus Triumphant (1800), Napoleon as Mars the Peacemaker (1803–1806), Pauline Bonaparte as Venus Victrix (1804–1808), Theseus Fighting the Centaur (1804–1819), The Three Graces (1815–1817), etc.

Another outstanding sculptor was the Danish Bertel Thorvaldsen, who, despite his noble and serene classicism, has had his merit detracted from by some critics, who call his work insipid and empty. Even so, during his lifetime, he enjoyed enormous success, and a museum was built in his honor in his hometown of Copenhagen. Thorvaldsen directly studied Greek sculpture by restoring the pediments of the Temple of Aphaia in Aegina, before they were installed in the Munich Glyptotheque. His most famous work is Jason with the Golden Fleece (1803–1828), inspired by Polyclitus' Doriphorus, while his other works include: Cupid and Psyche (1807), Mars and Cupid (1812), Venus with the Apple (1813–16), Aurora with the Genie of Light (1815), Hebe (1815), Ganymede with Jupiter's Eagle (1817), The Three Graces with Cupid (1817–1818), etc.

Another notable exponent was the Englishman John Flaxman, a precocious artist who at the age of ten was already creating sculptures, and who had a fruitful career both as an artist and as an academic and treatise writer, writing several works on sculptural practice, such as Ten Discourses on Sculpture and Anatomical Studies. His works include numerous nudes, such as Cephalus and Aurora (1790), The Fury of Atamas (1790–1794), Mercury and Pandora (1805), Achilles violated by the scorpion (1810), Saint Michael Overcoming Satan (1818–1822), etc. In addition, he was an excellent draughtsman and engraver, with a great virtuosity in line drawing and a fine profilism, illustrating with mastery numerous classic works of literature. In the Germanic field also developed a remarkable sculptural school, highlighting artists such as: Franz Anton von Zauner (Genius Bornii, 1785), Rudolph Schadow (Paris, 1812), Johann Heinrich Dannecker (Ariadne on the panther, 1812–1814) and Johann Nepomuk Schaller (Bellerophon Fighting the Chimera, 1821).

In Spain, neoclassicism was practiced by several academic painters, such as Eusebio Valdeperas (Susanna and the Elders) and Dióscoro Teófilo Puebla (Las hijas del Cid, 1871), while neoclassical sculptors include José Álvarez Cubero (Ganymede, 1804; Apolino, 1810–1815; Nestor and Antilochus [or The Defense of Zaragoza], 1818), Juan Adán (Venus of the Alameda, 1795), Damià Campeny (Diana in the Bath, 1803; Dying Lucretia, 1804; Achilles removing the arrow from his heel, 1837), Antoni Solà (Meleagro, 1818), Sabino Medina (The nymph Eurydice bitten by an asp while fleeing from Eurystheus, 1865), Jeronimo Suñol (Hymenaeus, 1864), etc.

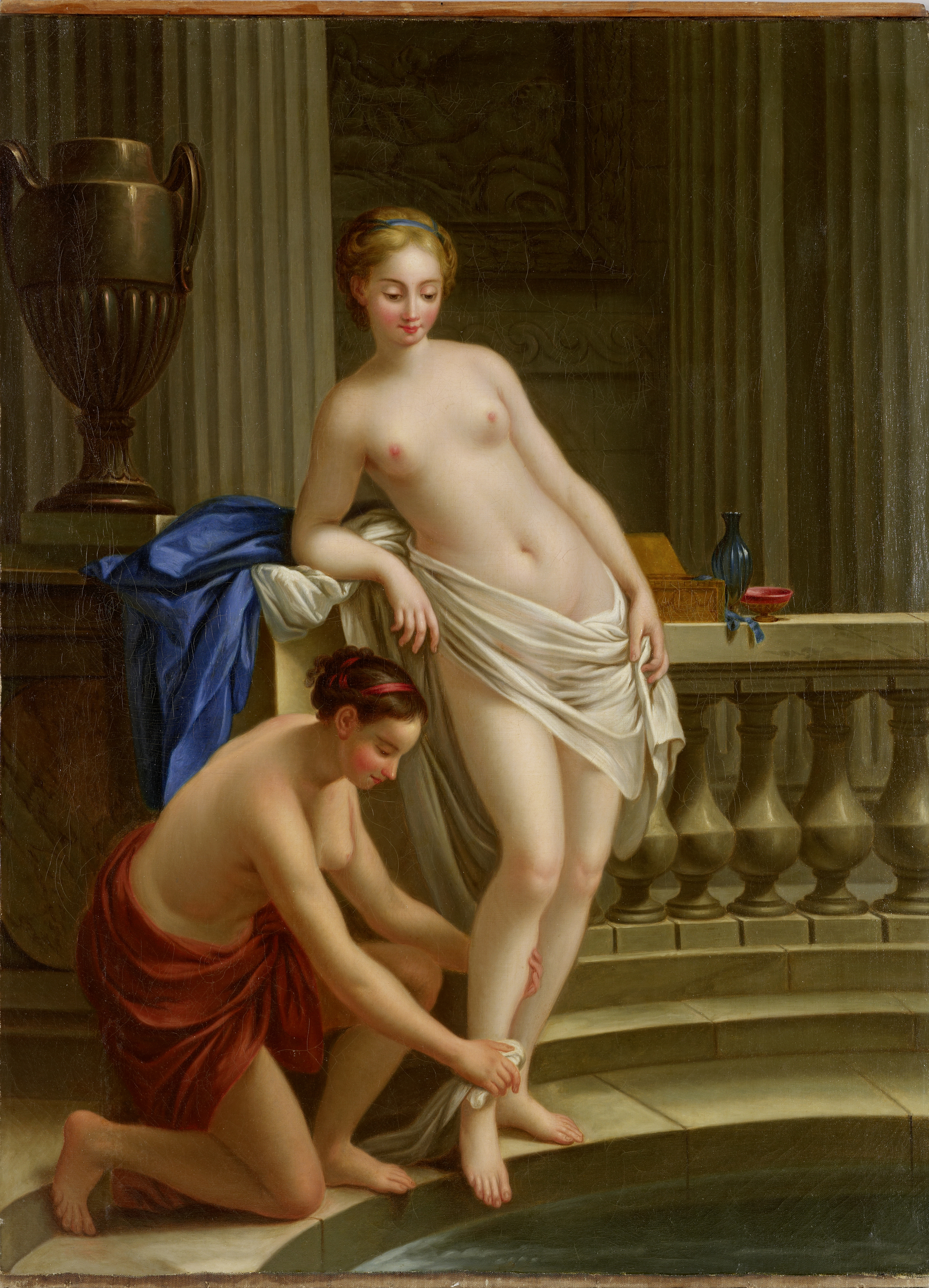
Two Women Bathing (1763), by Joseph-Marie Vien, Henri-Martin Museum, Cahors.

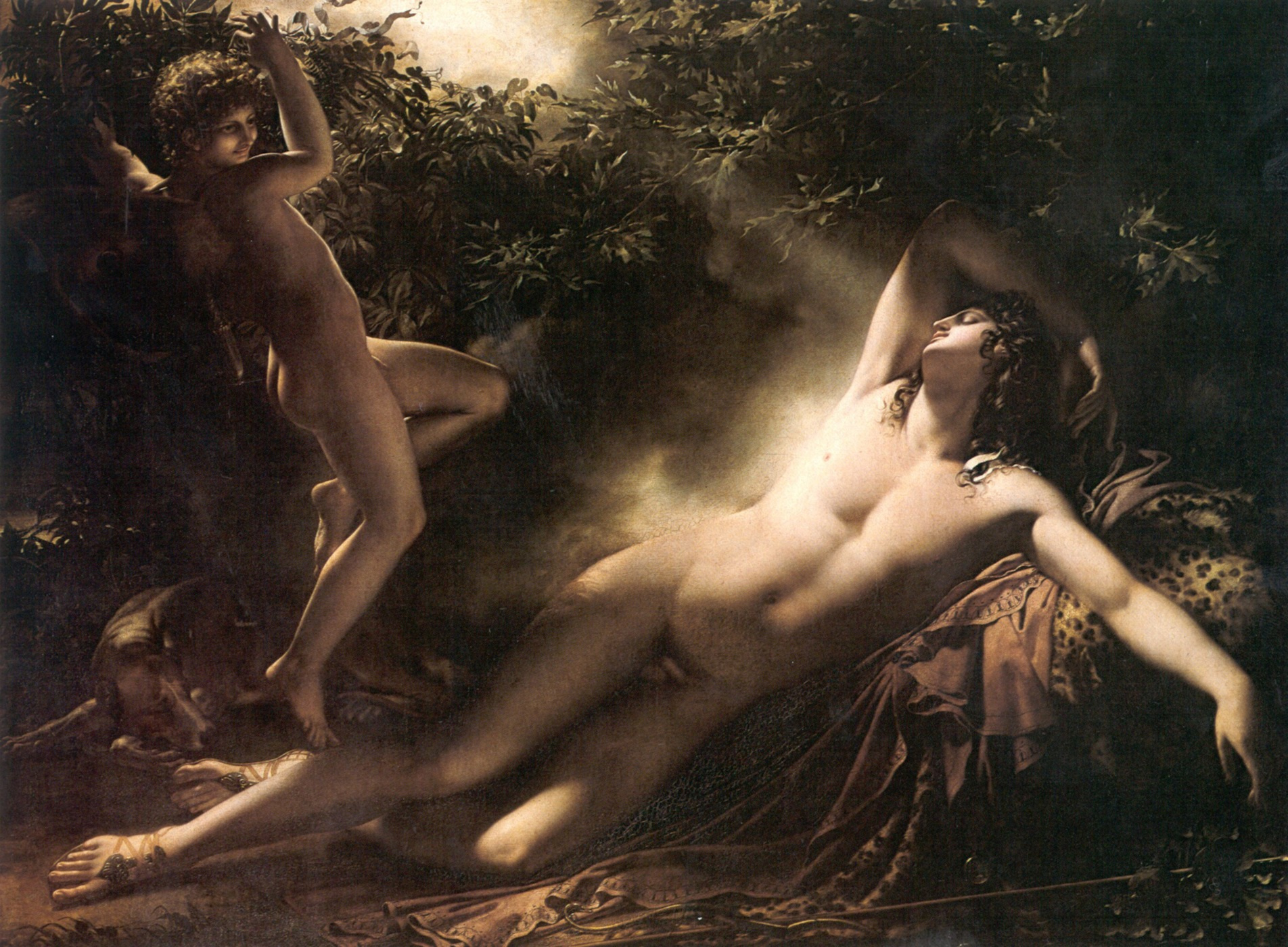
The Dream of Endymion (1791), by Anne-Louis Girodet de Roussy-Trioson, Musée du Louvre, Paris.

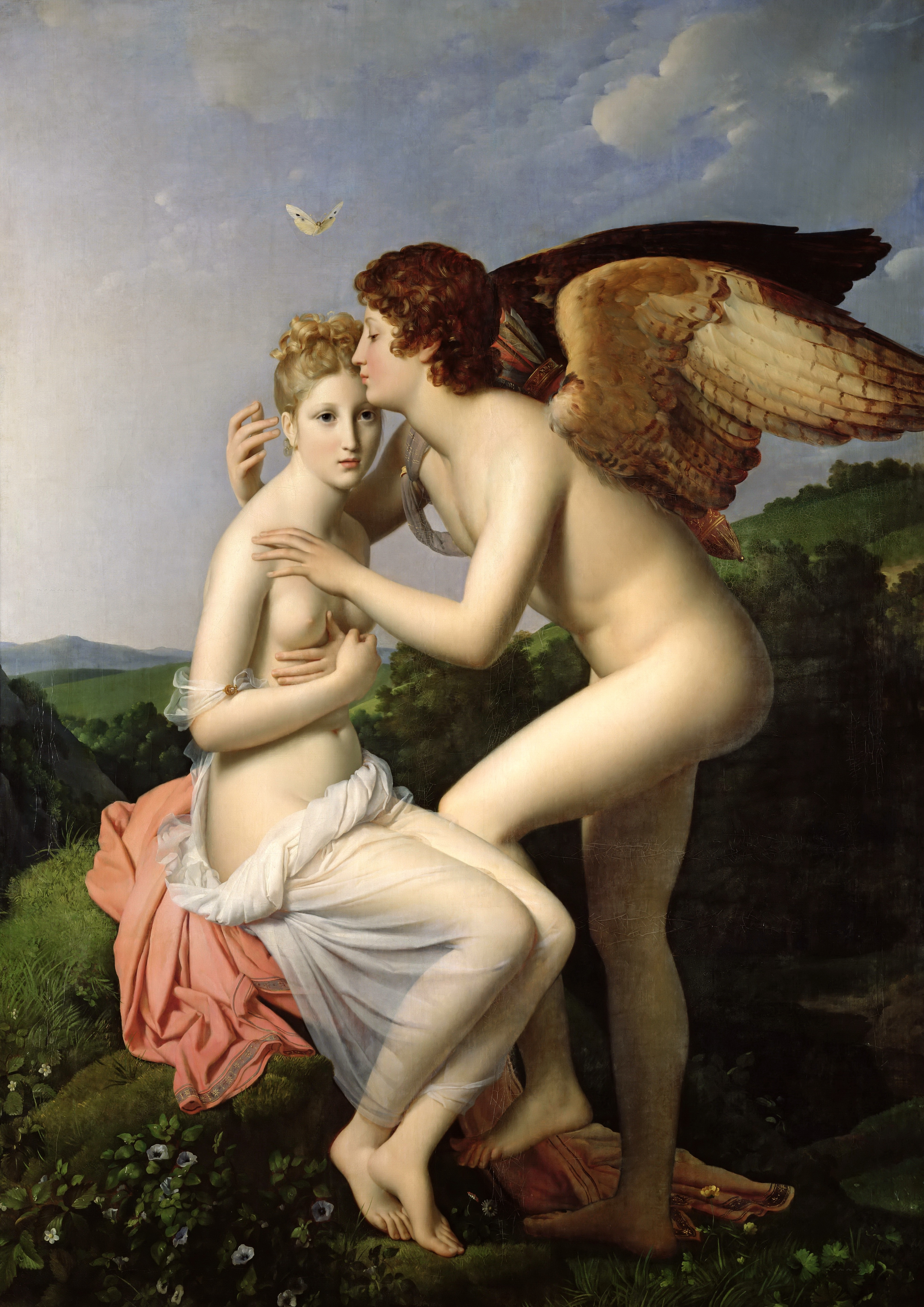
Psyche and Amor (1797), by François Gérard, Louvre Museum, Paris.

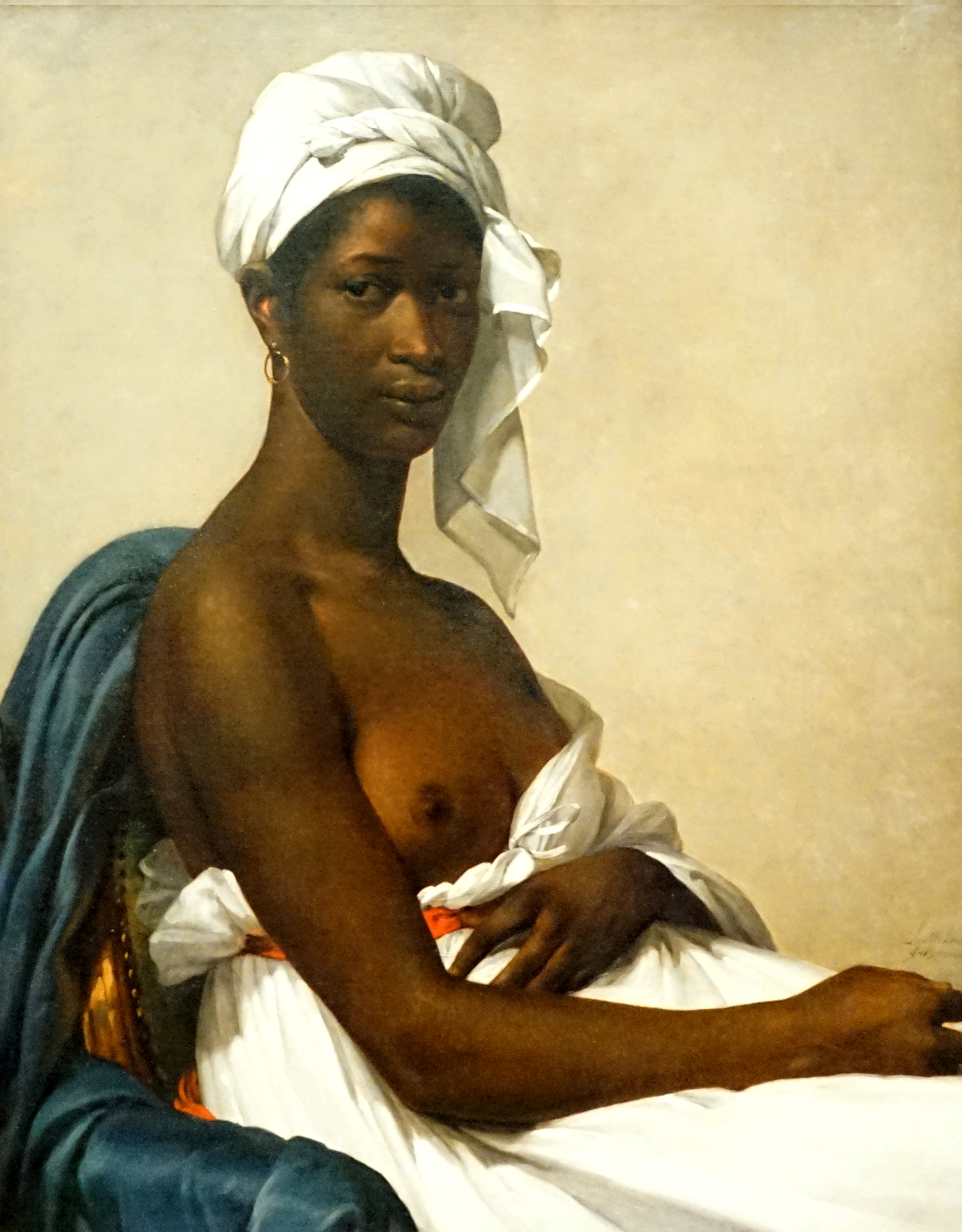
Portrait of a black woman (1800), by Marie-Guillemine Benoist, Musée du Louvre, Paris.

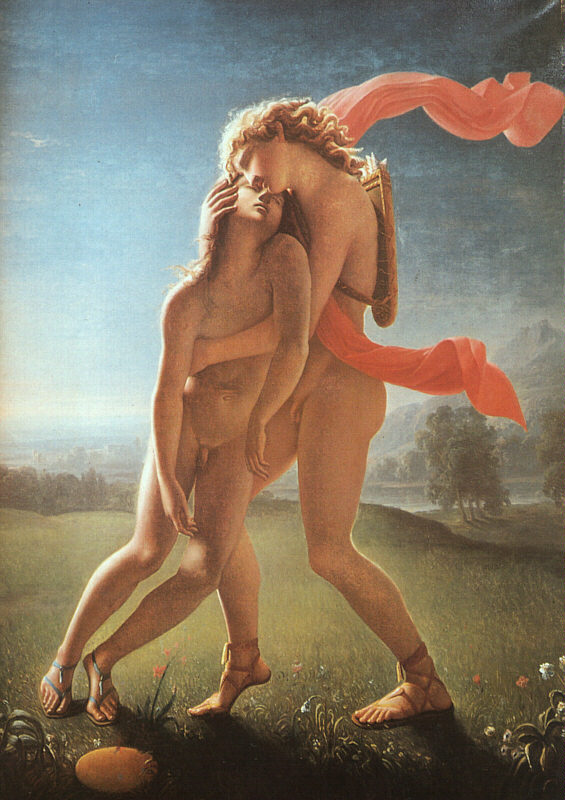
The Death of Hyacinthos (1801), by Jean Broc, Musée Sainte-Croix, Poitiers.

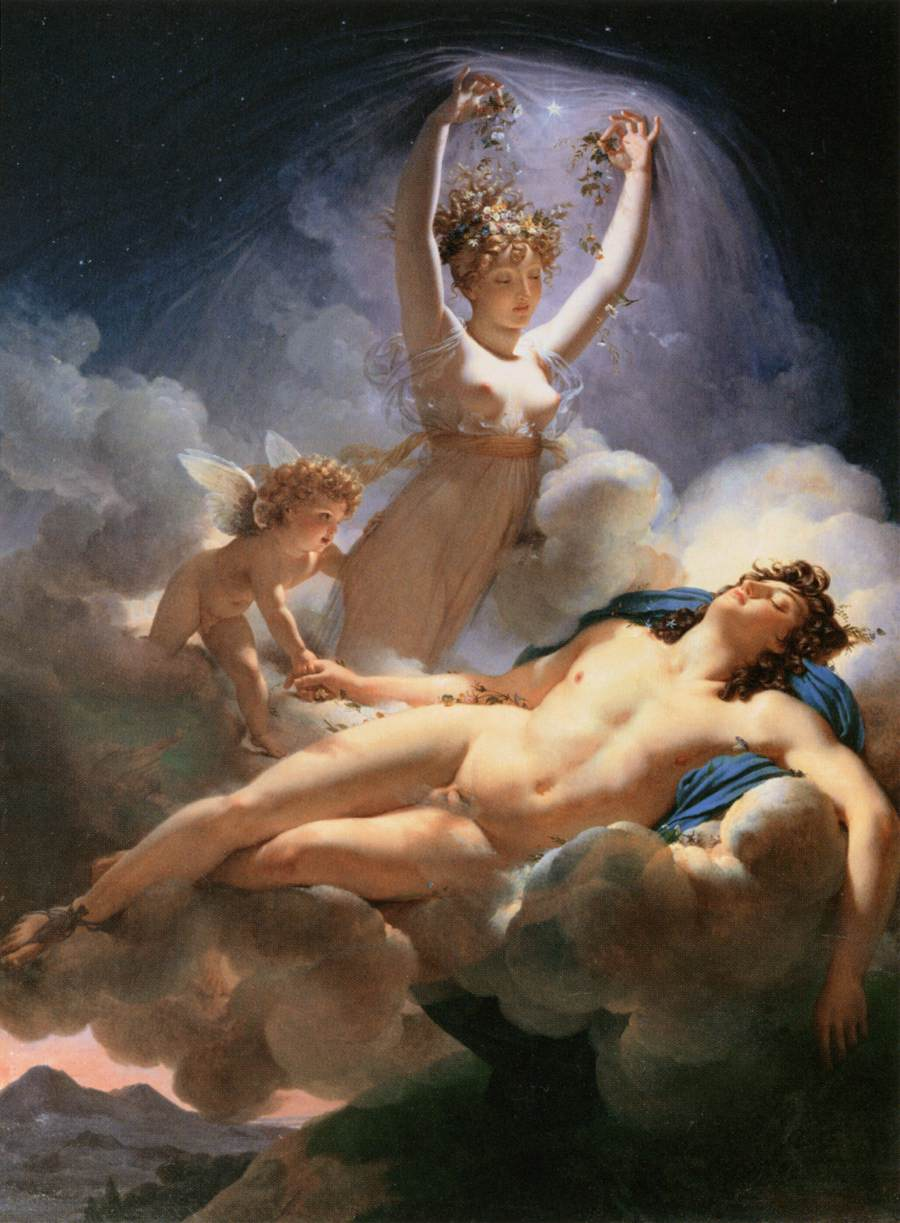
Aurora and Cephalus (1810), by Pierre-Narcisse Guérin, Musée du Louvre, Paris.

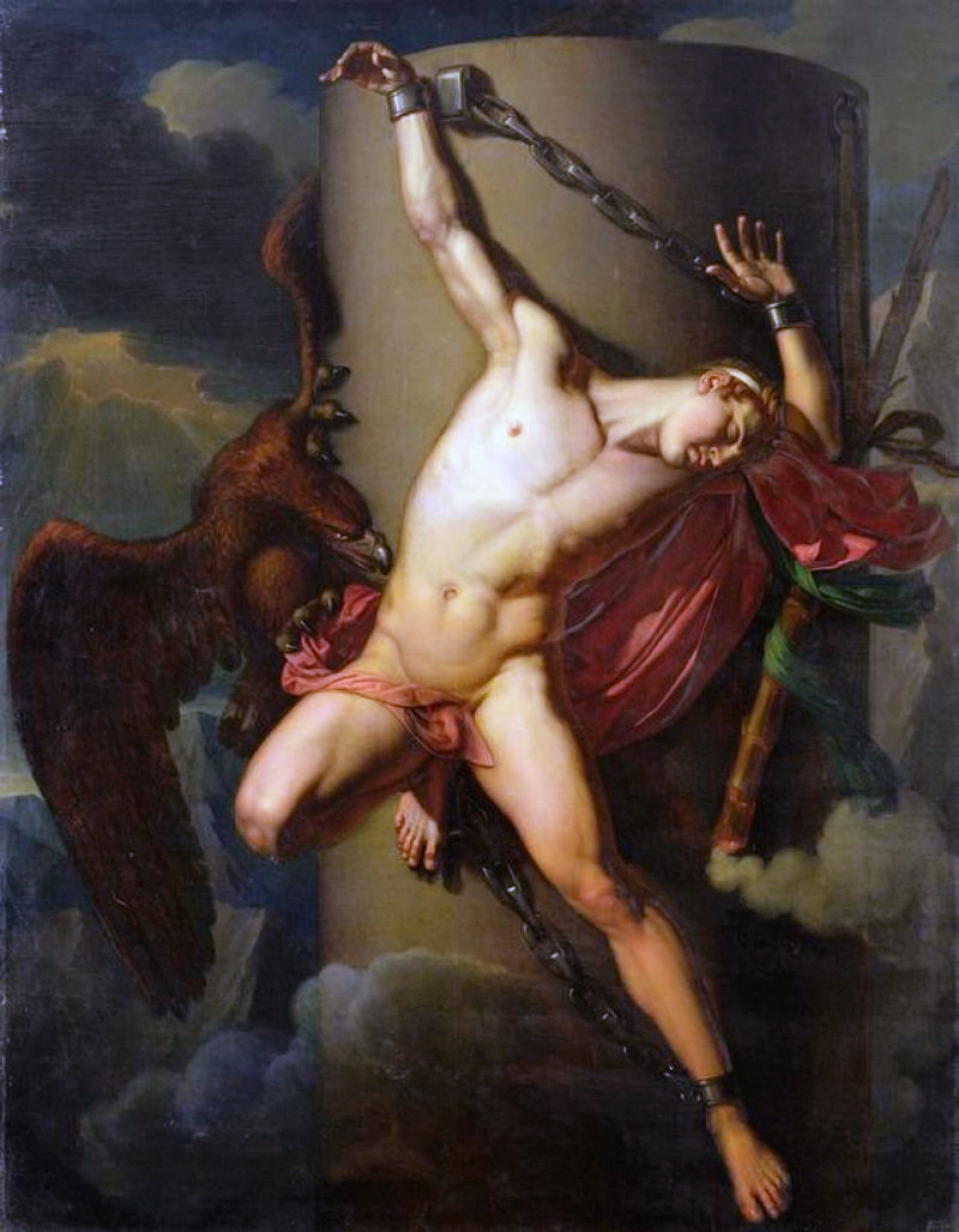
The Torture of Prometheus (1819), by Jean-Louis-Cesar Lair, Musée Crozatier, Le Puy-en-Velay.

== Contemporary Art ==
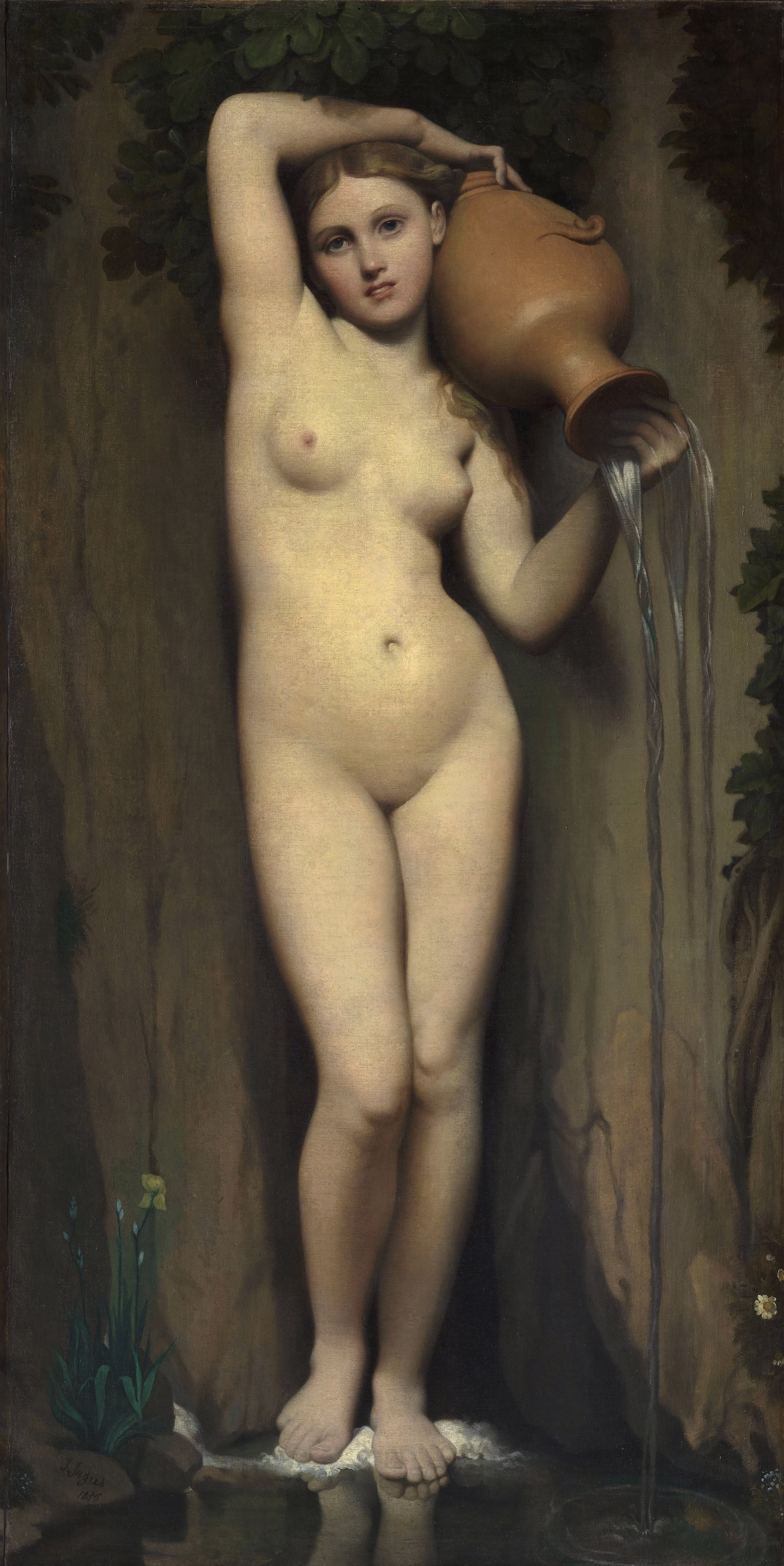
The Source (1856), by Jean Auguste Dominique Ingres, Musée d'Orsay, Paris.

=== 19th century ===
Between the end of the 18th century and the beginning of the 19th century, the foundations of contemporary society were laid, marked in the political field by the end of absolutism and the establishment of democratic governments—an impulse initiated with the French Revolution; and, in the economic field, by the Industrial Revolution and the strengthening of capitalism, which will have a response in Marxism and the class struggle. In the field of art, an evolutionary dynamic of styles began to unfold chronologically with increasing speed, culminating in the twentieth century with an atomization of styles and currents that coexist and oppose, influence and confront each other. Modern art arises in opposition to academic art, placing the artist at the forefront of humanity's cultural evolution.

The nineteenth-century nude follows the guidelines for the representation of the nude set by previous styles, though reinterpreted in different ways depending on whether a greater realism or an idealism rooted in classical tradition is sought. In the 19th century, the female nude abounded more than ever—especially in the second half of the century—more than in any other period in the history of art. However, the female role changes to become a mere object of sexual desire, in a process of dehumanization of the female figure, subjected to the dictates of a predominantly macho society. In these works, there is a strong dose of voyeurism; the woman is surprised while sleeping or grooming, in intimate scenes, but open to the viewer, who can recreate in the contemplation of forbidden images, of stolen moments. It is not a premeditated nudity; it is not a model posing, but the recreation of scenes of everyday life, with an apparent naturalness, yet forced by the artist. In the words of Carlos Reyero, "we find ourselves with women not naked, but undressed".

==== Romanticism ====
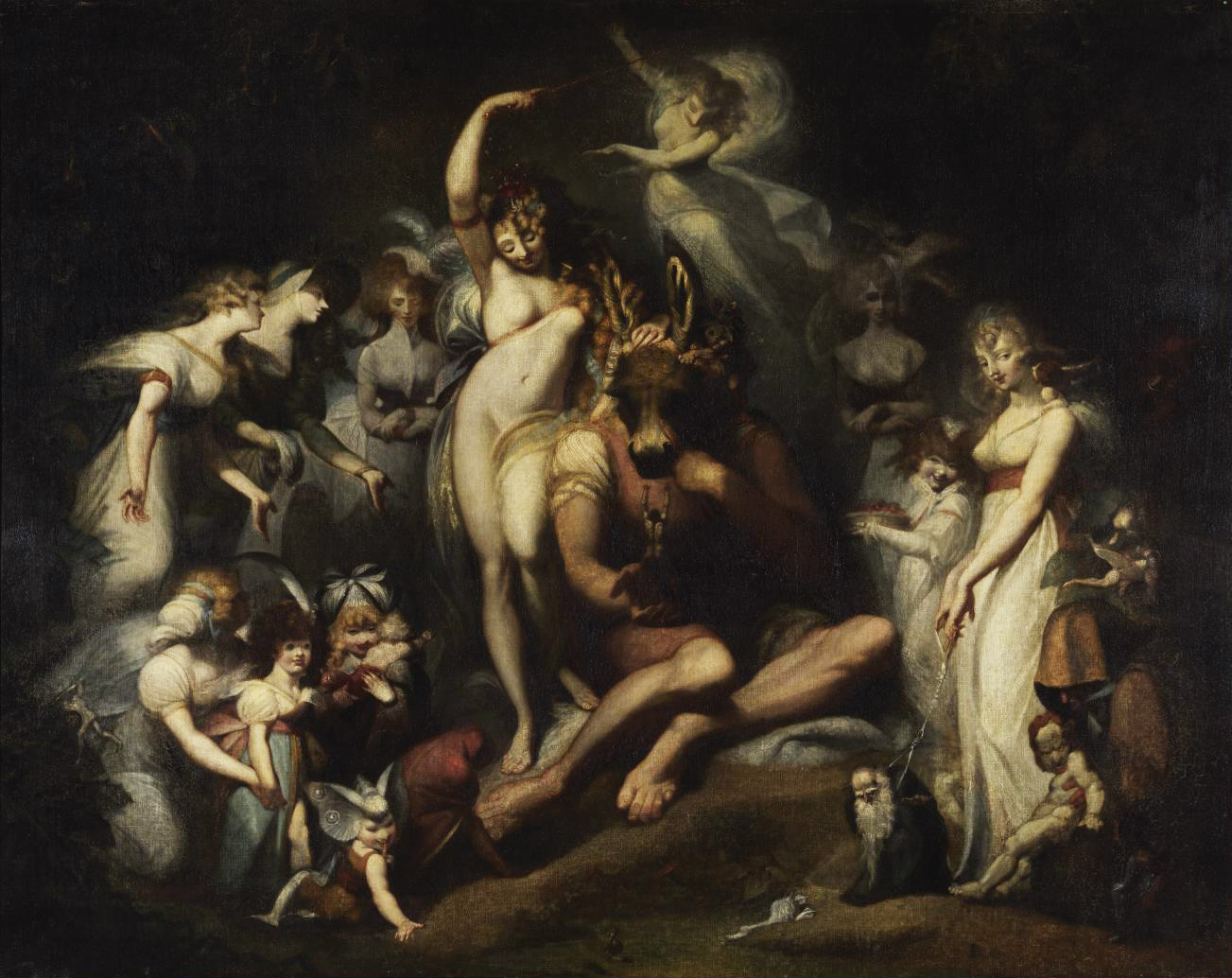
Titania and Bottom (1790), by Johann Heinrich Füssli, Tate Gallery, London.

A movement of profound renewal in all artistic genres, the Romantics paid special attention to the field of spirituality, imagination, fantasy, sentiment, dreamy evocation, love of nature, together with a darker element of irrationality, attraction to occultism, madness, and dreams. Popular culture, the exotic, the return to underrated artistic forms of the past—particularly medieval ones—were especially valued. The Romantics envisioned an art that arose spontaneously from the individual, emphasizing the figure of the "genius"—art as the expression of the artist's emotions. The romantic nude is more expressive, more importance is given to color than to the line of the figure—unlike in neoclassicism—with a more dramatic sense, in themes that vary from the exotic and the taste for orientalism to the most purely romantic themes: dramas, tragedies, heroic and passionate acts, exacerbated feelings, songs to freedom, to the pure expression of the interior of the human being.

Romanticism had two notable precursors in Great Britain: Johann Heinrich Füssli and William Blake. The former, of Swiss origin, developed a mannerist style influenced by Dürer, Pontormo, Baccio Bandinelli and Michelangelo, with a work of a certain conceptual duality: on the one hand erotic and violent themes, on the other a virtue and simplicity influenced by Rousseau. Between 1770 and 1778, he elaborated a series of erotic images called "drawings of simplegma" (intertwining), where sex is related to passion and suffering, in plates that evoke the ancient bacchic and priapic rites, with a crude and realistic eroticism far from the rococo gallantry. Some of his works are: Hamlet, Horatio, Marcellus and the Ghost (1780–1785), Titania and Bottom (1790), Reclining Nude and Woman at the Piano (1800) and Courtesan with Feather Ornament (1800–1810). William Blake was a visionary artist, whose dreamlike output is matched only by the fantastic unreality of surrealism. Artist and writer, he illustrated his own literary works, or classics such as The Divine Comedy (1825–1827) or the Book of Job (1823–1826), with a personal style that reveals his inner world, full of dreams and emotions, with evanescent figures that seem to float in a space not subject to physical laws, generally in nocturnal environments, with cold and liquid lights, with a profusion of arabesques. Influenced by Michelangelo and Mannerism, his figures have the dynamic torsion of the Michelangelesque Last Judgment, although sometimes they are based on classical canons, as in The Dance of Albion (Glad Day) (1794–1796), whose posture is taken from a version of the Vitruvian Man, that of Vincenzo Scamozzi in Idea dell'architettura universale. Other works of his are: Nebuchadnezzar (1795), Newton (1795), Europe Supported by Africa and America (1796), Satan in his original glory (1805), The Lover's Whirlwind. Francesca da Rimini and Paolo Malatesta (1824–1827), etc.

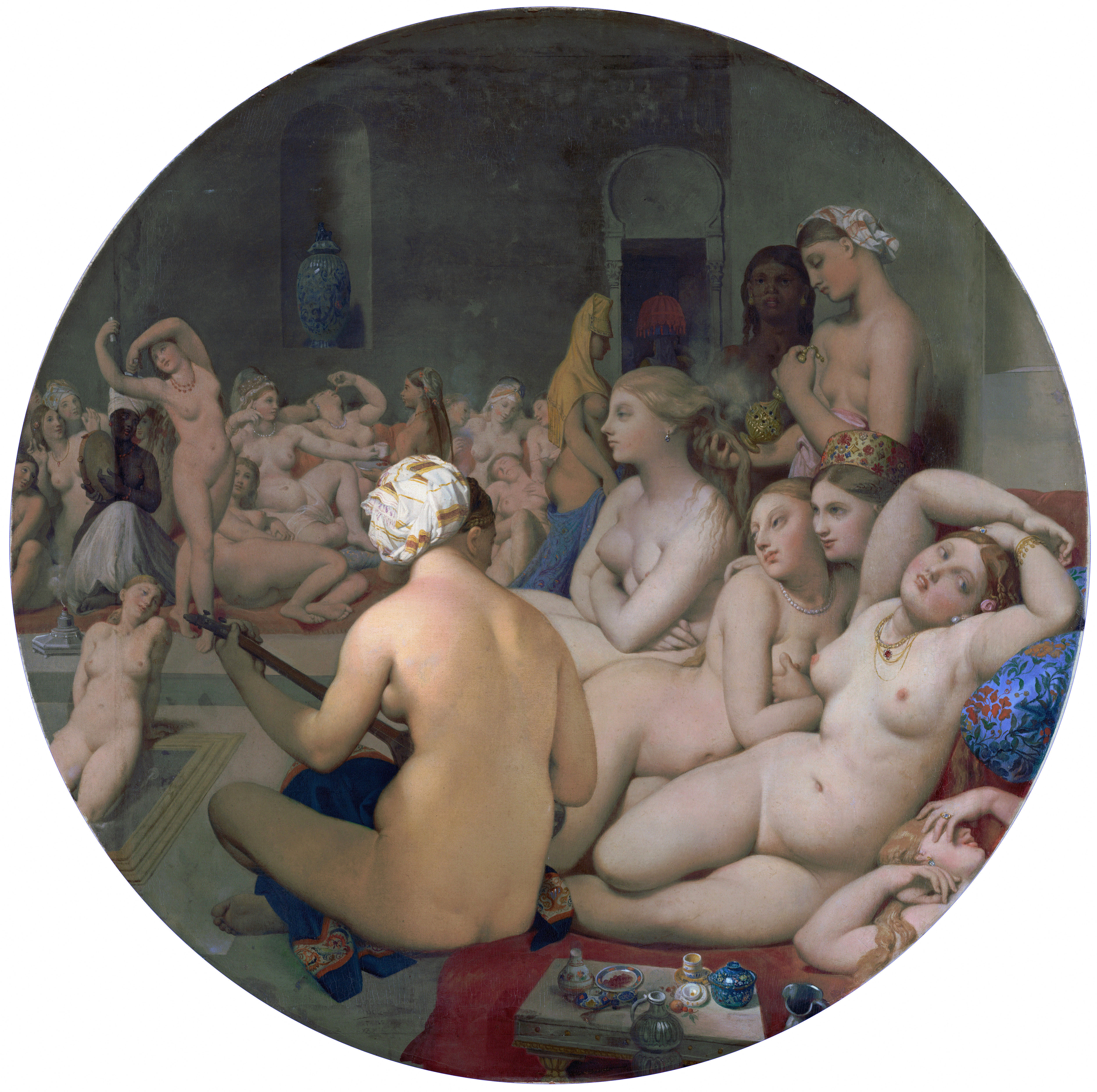
The Turkish Bath (1862), by Jean Auguste Dominique Ingres, Louvre Museum, Paris.

Between neoclassicism and romanticism is the work of Jean Auguste Dominique Ingres, whose figures are halfway between sensuality and concern for pure form, which he treated meticulously, almost obstinately. His female figures have a certain Gothic air (small breasts, prominent stomachs) and were subject to a small number of postural designs that the artist felt comfortable with and repeated throughout his career. One of these, for example, was that of a nude woman seated on her back, which he introduced in The Valpinçon Bather (1808) and which is discernible, within a group scene, in The Turkish Bath. Another is the standing figure of the Venus Anadyomene (1848), with a Botticellian air, of which he made several versions, and which he later transformed into a young woman with a pitcher of water, The Spring (1856). Other works are more personal, such as Grande Odalisque (1814), which recalls the mannerism of the School of Fontainebleau and initiated his fondness for orientalism and exotic figures and environments. In The Golden Age (1840–1848), he painted a large mural composed entirely of nudes, a work which, however, remained unfinished. The Turkish Bath (1862) is perhaps his most famous work, and the culmination of his lifelong study of the nude. He returned to Orientalism, with a scene set in a harem, accentuating the curved and rounded forms of the models, who shamelessly show their prominent breasts and wide hips, with a sensuality unusual until then in Western art. Other works of his are: The Envoys of Agamemnon (1801), Oedipus and the Sphinx (1808–1825), Jupiter and Thetis (1811), The Dream of Ossian (1813), Roger Freeing Angelica (1819), Odalisque with Slave (1842), etc.

His disciples were: Antoine-Jean Gros, chronicler of the Napoleonic deeds, made in Bonaparte visiting the plague victims of Jaffa (1804) some nudes of intense dramatism, showing with crudeness the effects of the disease; and Théodore Chassériau, who tried to synthesize the line of Ingres with the colorfulness of Delacroix, although his work tends to academicism (Venus Anadyomene, 1838; Susanna and the Elders, 1839; Diana surprised by Actaeon, 1840; Andromeda chained to the rock by the Nereids, 1840; The Toilette of Esther, 1841; Sleeping Nymph, 1850; The Tepidarium, 1853). Théodore Géricault was influenced by Michelangelo, as can be seen in the central figure of The Raft of the Medusa (1819), which is one of the athletes of the Sistine Chapel, while other figures are reminiscent of those in Raphael's Transfiguration. For his studies of anatomy, Géricault frequently visited morgues and even prisons where prisoners were executed. In his Leda and the Swan (1822), he transposed the dynamic energy of classical athletes onto a female figure, and her posture recalls that of the Ilyssus on the Parthenon, exchanging athletic effort for sexual excitement.

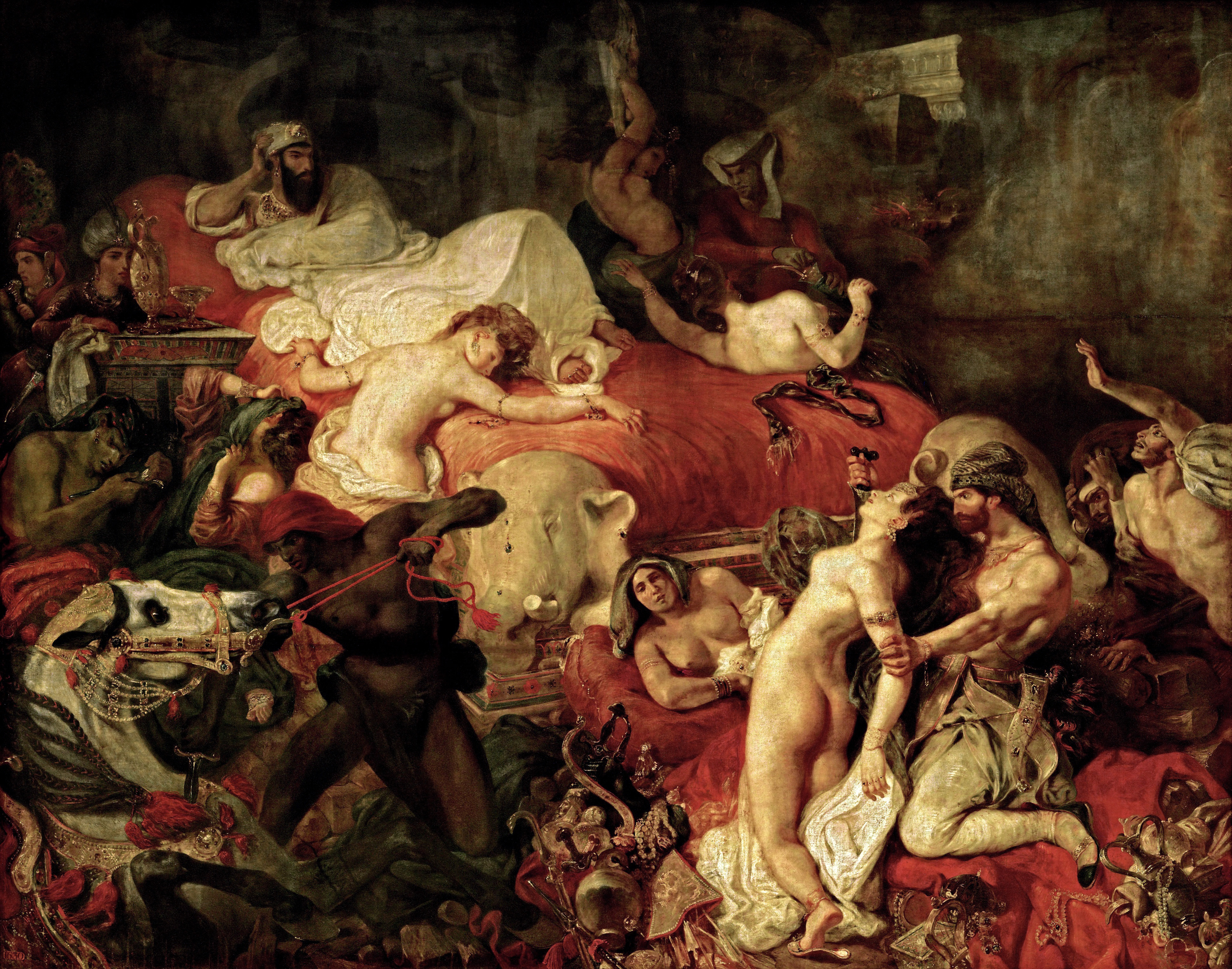
The Death of Sardanapalus (1827), by Eugène Delacroix, Musée du Louvre, Paris.

Eugène Delacroix was one of the first artists to deviate from the official academic art, replacing the outlined contour drawing with a less precise and fluid line, dynamic and suggestive, and a chromatism of vibrant adjacent tones and an effectiveness based on a certain divisionism of color. During his training, he made copies of the great masters exhibited at the Louvre, with a predilection for Rubens and Venetian artists. Already in his first works, Dante and Virgil in Hell (1822), The Massacre at Chios (1824) and The Death of Sardanapalus (1827), he demonstrated his originality and inventive richness, along with a passionate and colorful style that would characterize him. In 1832, he made a trip to Morocco and Algeria, where he incorporated orientalist influences into his style, with a taste for the exotic and the richness of detail. In his numerous nude works the subject matter is very diverse, from the religious (The Expulsion of Adam and Eve from Paradise, Christ at the column, Christ on the Cross, Christ resurrected, St. Sebastian Tended to by St. Irene and her Maid), the mythological (Triumph of Apollo, Labors of Hercules, Achilles and the centaur, Anacreon and Love, Andromeda and Perseus, Ariadne and Theseus, Medea and her children), the historical and literary (The Divine Comedy, Marphise, Jerusalem Liberated), to the genre scenes or the nude by itself (Odalisque lying, Turkish Women Bathing, The Woman in Silk Stockings, Woman Combing Her Hair, Bathing Woman on Her Back, Sleeping Nymph, Woman Stroking a Parrot). For Delacroix, any pretext was good to show physical beauty, as in the allegory of Liberty Leading the People (1830), where the heroine who leads the popular revolution appears with bare breasts. A great draughtsman, he also bequeathed numerous sketches and preliminary studies of nude figures.

Followers of Delacroix were: Narcisse-Virgile Díaz de la Peña, great landscape painter and author of nudes such as The Fairy Pool, Venus and Adonis, Nymphs in the Forest and Love Reproved and Disarmed; Gustave Doré, who excelled mainly as a draftsman and illustrator of literary works, where he shows great imagination and formal mastery, as in the Bible, The Divine Comedy, Orlando furioso, some Shakespearean Dramas, Goethe's Faust, etc. Félix Trutat, whose Nude Girl on a Panther's Skin (1844) is reminiscent of Goya's La maja desnuda and precedes Manet's Olympia.

In sculpture, François Rude evolved from neoclassicism to romanticism, in works of great expressive force where the nude played a leading role, with colossal figures that translate in their anatomy the dynamism of the action, as can be seen in Mercury fastening his heel wings (1827), Young Neapolitan Fisherman playing with a turtle (1833), Victorious Love (1855), Hebe and the Eagle (1855), and his main work, La Marseillaise (1833), at the Arc de Triomphe in Paris. Jean-Baptiste Carpeaux denoted the same stylistic process, from classical serenity to romantic feeling, with figures of intense dynamism, such as his Flora of the Tuileries Palace (1865), Ugolino and His Sons (1863) or the group of The Dance (1869), at the Paris Opera House.

In Italy, romanticism arrived with the Napoleonic conquest, with artists such as Pelagio Palagi (The betrothal of Cupid and Psyche, 1808) or Francesco Hayez (Penitent Magdalene, 1825). In sculpture, Lorenzo Bartolini evolved from classicism to a naturalism inspired by the plastic models of the Florentine Quattrocento, as in Trust in God (1835). Another exponent was Giovanni Dupré (The death of Abel, 1842).

In Spain, Romanticism was impregnated with Goyaesque influence, as shown in the two majas desnudas painted by Eugenio Lucas, and in other works by artists such as José Gutiérrez de la Vega (La maja desnuda, 1840–1850), Antonio María Esquivel (Venus anadyomene, 1838; Susanna and the Elders, 1840; Joseph and Potiphar's wife, 1854), Víctor Manzano (Scene from the Inquisition, 1860), etc. In sculpture, a Spaniard established in Mexico, Manuel Vilar, was the author of Jason (1836) and Tlahuicole (1851), a sort of Mexican Hercules.

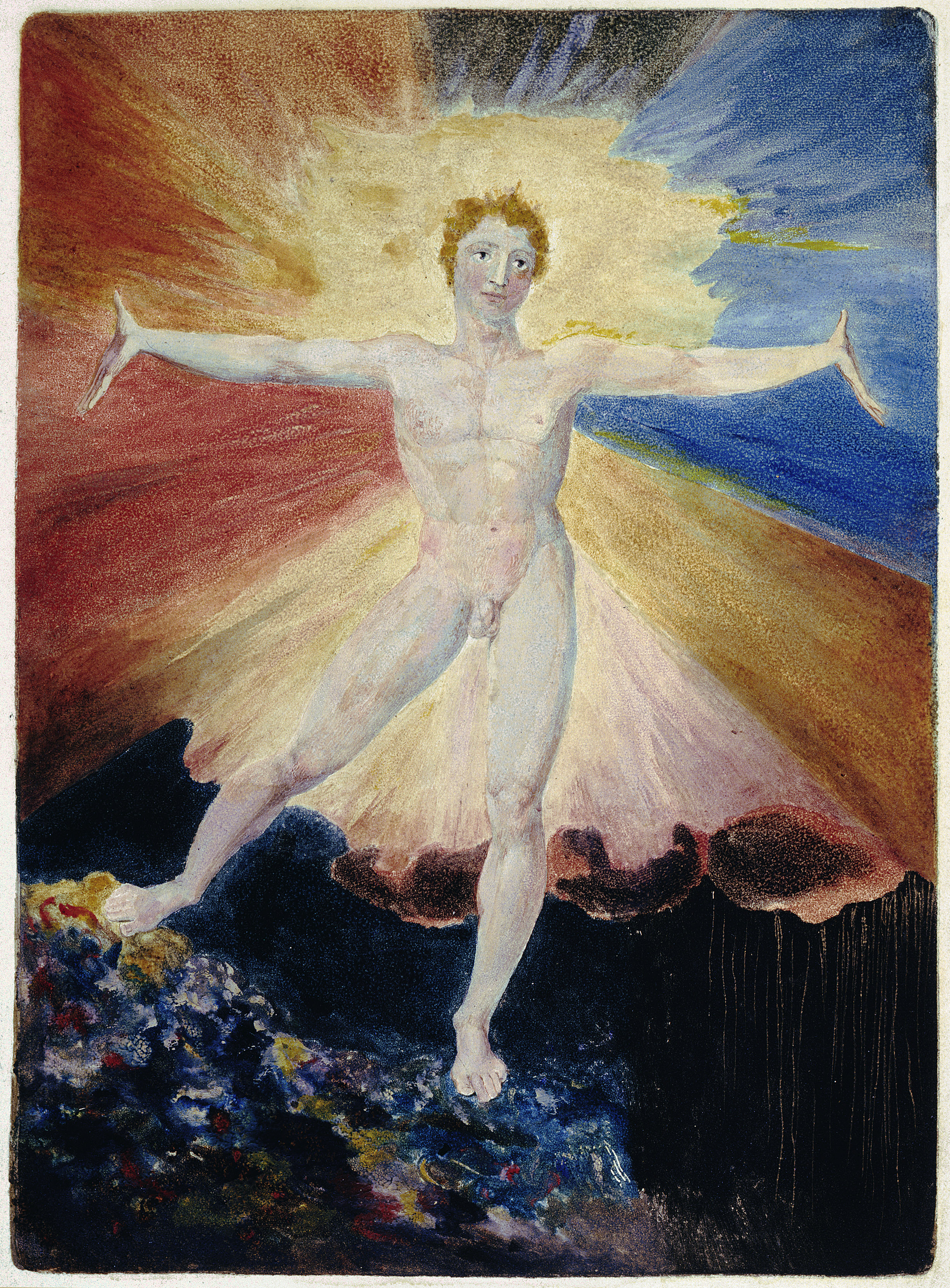
The Dance of Albion (Day of Joy) (1794–1796), by William Blake, Fitzwilliam Museum, Cambridge.

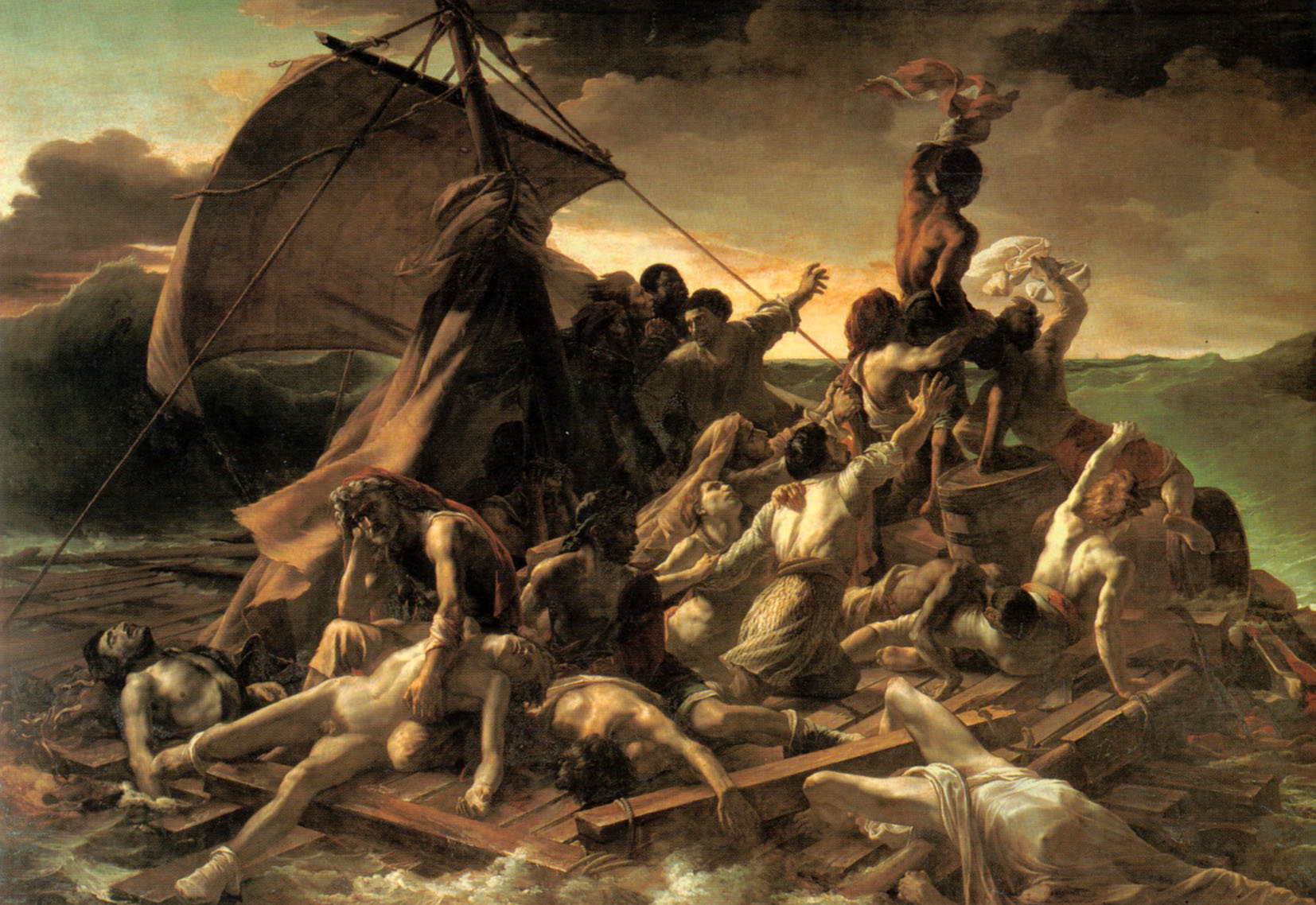
The Raft of the Medusa (1819), by Théodore Géricault, Louvre Museum, Paris.

Penitent Magdalene (1825), by Francesco Hayez, Civica Galleria d'Arte Moderna, Milan.

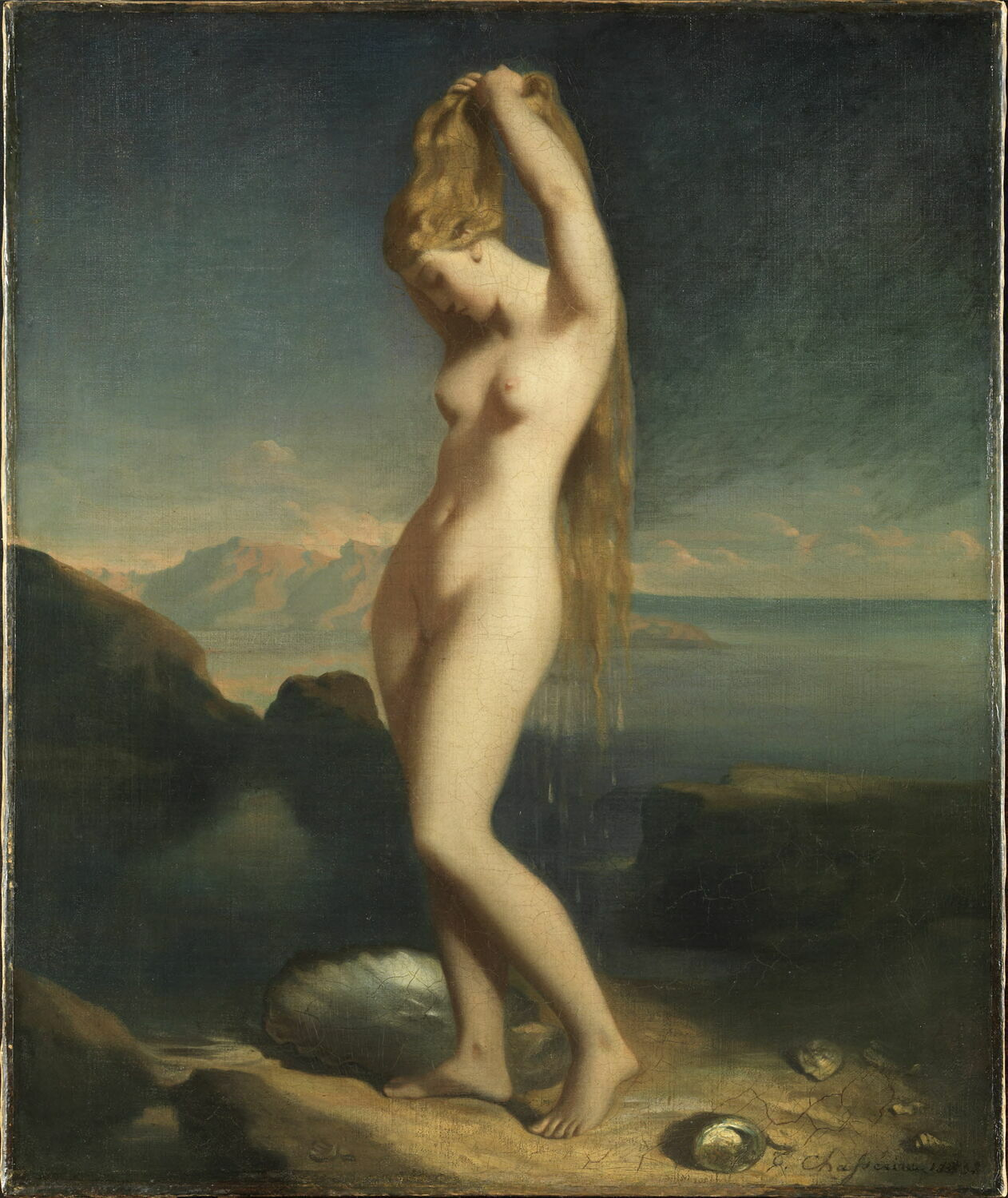
Venus Anadyomene (1838), by Théodore Chassériau, Musée du Louvre, Paris.

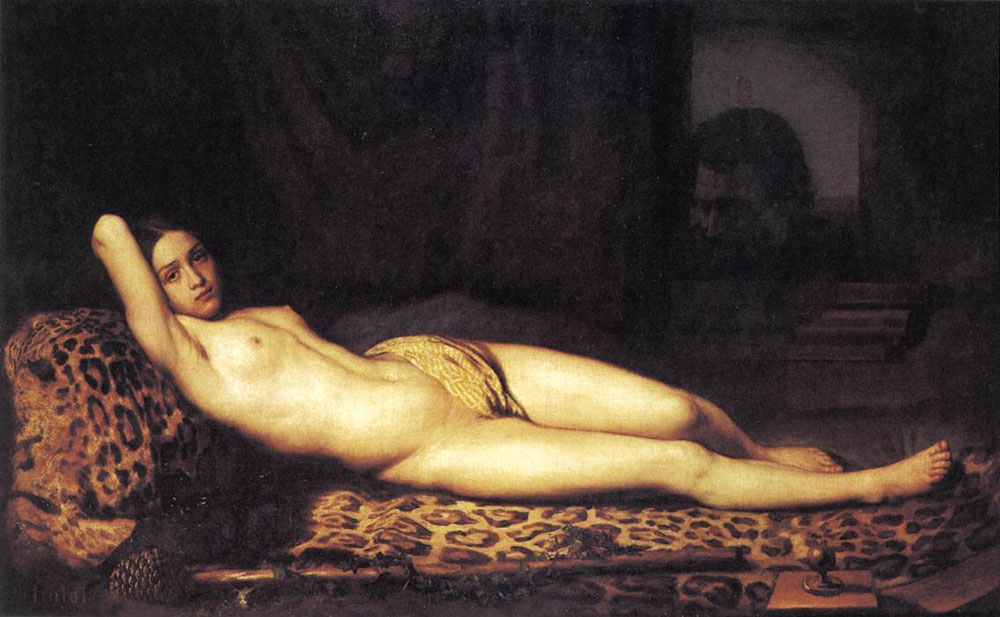
Nude girl on panther skin (1844), by Félix Trutat, Musée du Louvre, Paris.

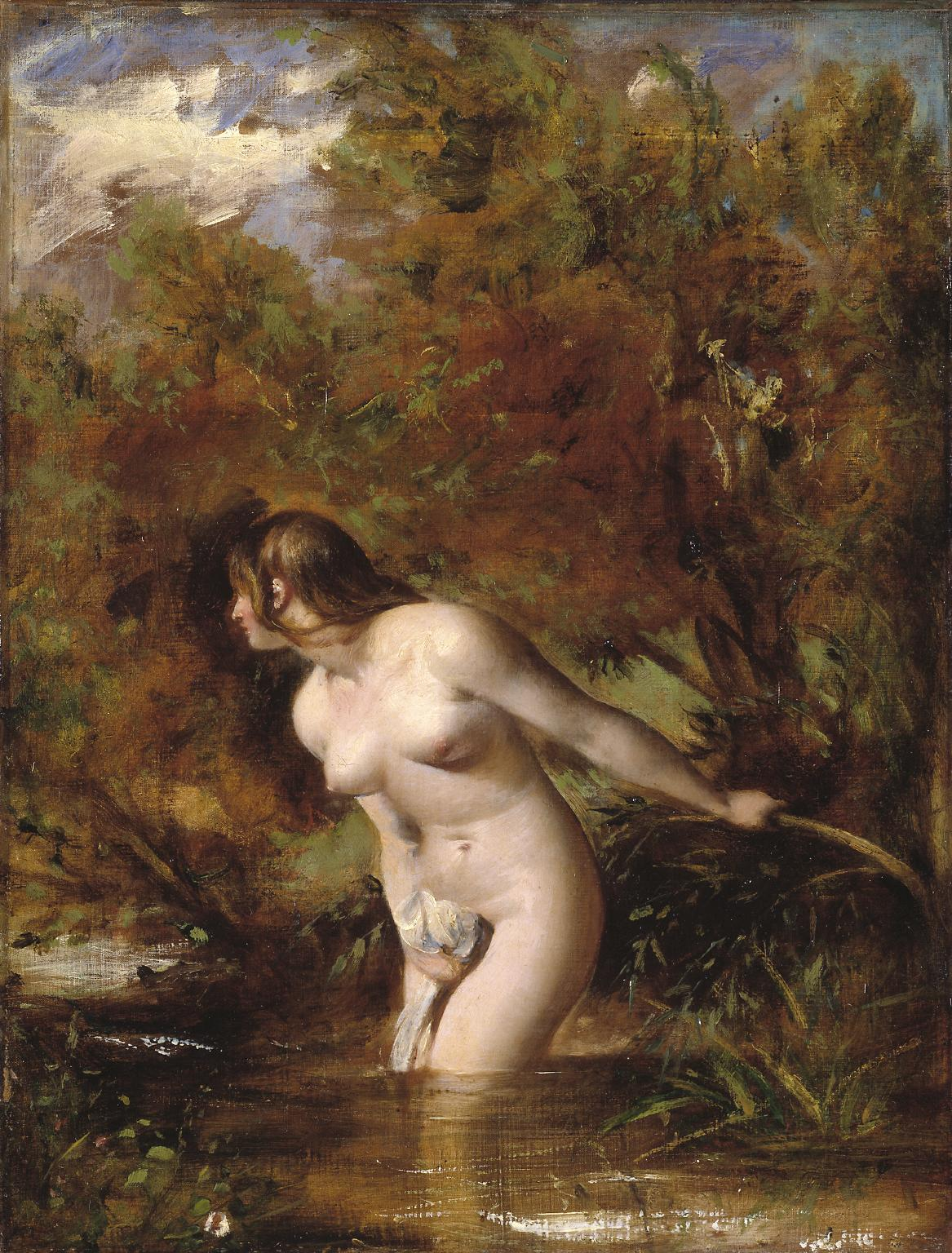
The Bather (1846), by William Etty, Tate Britain, London.

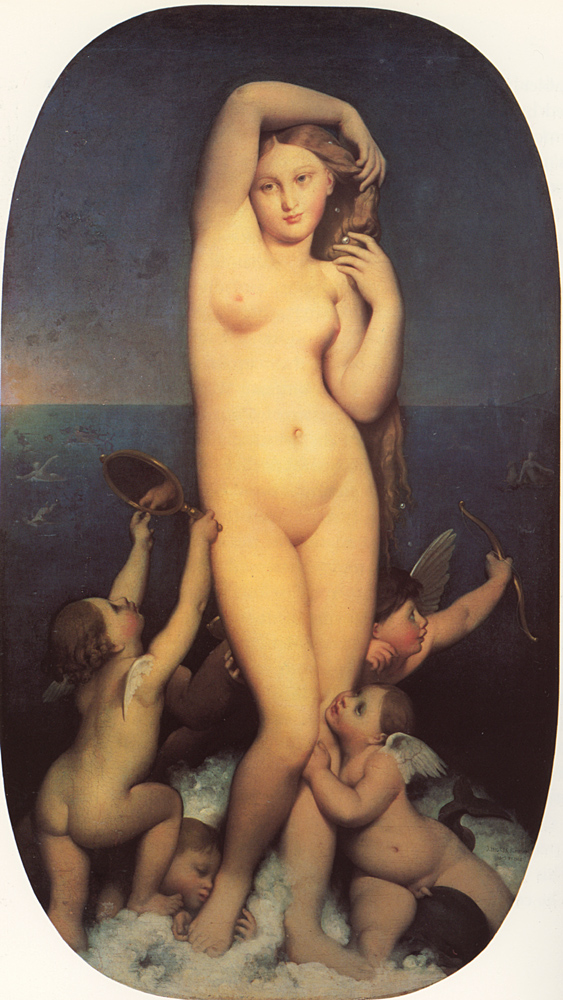
Venus Anadromena (1848), by Jean-Auguste-Dominique Ingres, Musée Condé, Chantilly.

==== Academicism ====
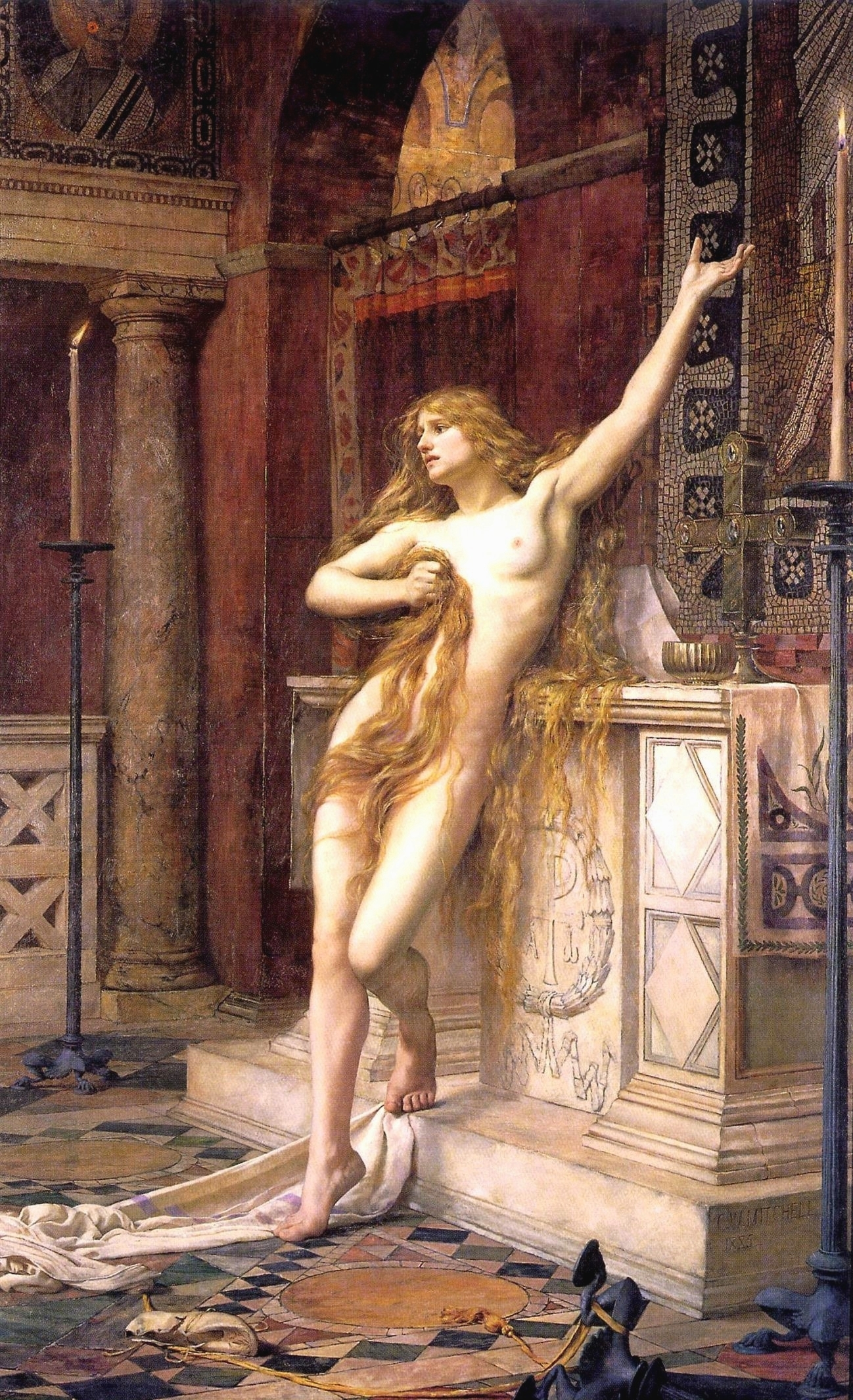
Hypatia (1885), by Charles William Mitchell, Laing Art Gallery, Newcastle upon Tyne.

Academic art is the art promoted since the 16th century by the academies of fine arts, which regulated the pedagogical training of artists. (Note: In 1563 the first academy was founded, the Florentine Accademia del Disegno, followed by the Accademia di San Luca in Rome (1577), the Académie Royal d'Art in Paris (1648), the Akademie der Künste in Berlin (1696), the Real Academia de Bellas Artes de San Fernando in Madrid (1744), the Imperial Academy of Arts in St. Petersburg (1757) and the Royal Academy of Arts in London (1768), among many others. (Chilvers (2007, p. 18))) Although in principle the academies were in tune with the art produced at the time, we can not speak of a distinct style. In the nineteenth century, when the evolutionary dynamics of the styles began to move away from the classical canons, academic art was corseted in a classicist style based on strict rules, so that today it is understood more as a period of the nineteenth century, receiving parallel various denominations, such as art pompier in France. (Note: Literally, "fireman's art," a pejorative designation derived from the fact that many authors depicted classical heroes with helmets that resembled fireman's helmets. (Chilvers (2007, pp. 752–753)).) It was primarily aimed at a bourgeois public, so its status as "official" art, together with the frequent accusation of conservatism and lack of imagination—according to the romantic concept that art cannot be taught—caused academicism to acquire a pejorative sense at the end of the 19th century, as it was considered anchored in the past and a reproducer of stultified formulas. (Note: Umberto Eco even includes academicism within the category of kitsch in his work History of ugliness (2007) (Eco (2007, p. 400)).)

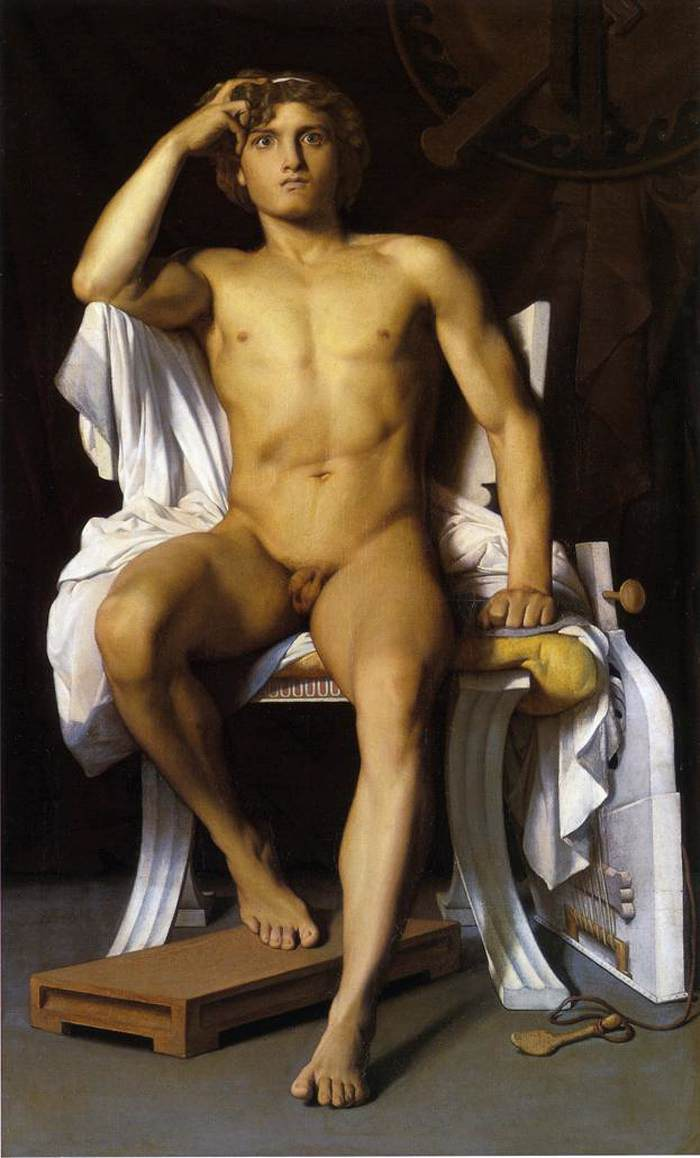
The Wrath of Achilles (1847), by François-Léon Benouville, Musée Fabre, Montpellier.

However, nowadays there is a tendency to revalue academic art and to consider it for its intrinsic qualities. It is usually accepted more as an artistic period than as a style. Academicism was stylistically based on Greco-Roman classicism, as well as on earlier classicist authors, such as Raphael, Poussin, and Guido Reni. Technically, they were based on careful drawing, formal balance, perfect line, plastic purity, and careful detailing, together with realistic and harmonious coloring. Their works were based on erudite themes (history, mythology, academic literature), with an idealized concept of beauty.

In academicism, the nude had a special relevance, considered the expression par excellence of the nobility of nature: in the words of Paul Valéry, "what love was for storytellers and poets, the nude was for the artists of the form". The academic nude meant standardization on classical premises subject to strict thematic and formal rules, subordinated to the generally puritanical environment of nineteenth-century society. The nude was only accepted as an expression of ideal beauty, so it was a modest, aseptic nude, based strictly on anatomical study. The acceptance of the classical nude as an expression of an ideal of beauty led to the censorship of any deviation from the classicist canons: thus, at the Great Exhibition in London in 1851, when the famous Crystal Palace was decorated with a gallery of marble nudes, all were accepted except the Greek Slave by Hiram Powers, which, despite being a copy of the Aphrodite of Cnidus, was criticized for appearing with her wrists handcuffed. However, the teaching practice exercised in the academies of life drawing allowed, in certain cases, the introduction of formal and stylistic novelties that rejuvenated the genre, giving it, at the same time, greater respectability as a product of intellectual elaboration.

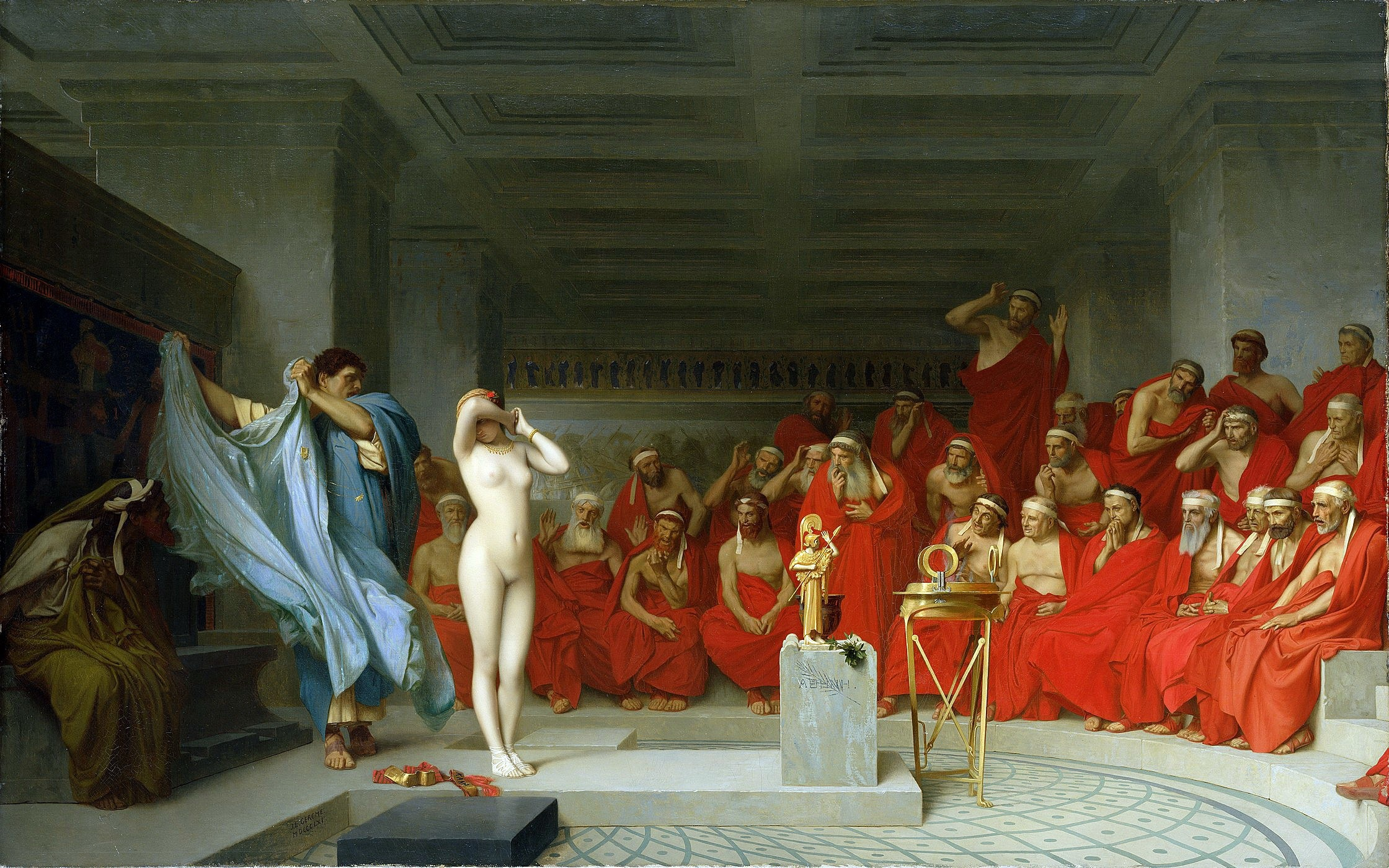
Phryne before the Areopagus (1861), by Jean-Léon Gérôme, Hamburg Kunsthalle.

A center of reference for the academic nude was the work of Ingres: according to Winckelmann's theory that the male nude could only express character, while the female nude was the only one that could reflect beauty, since this is more clearly shown in soft and sinuous forms, Ingres' nudes reflected a continuity in the stroke that gave his figures a rounded form, smooth texture and soft contour. As a result, academic art focused more on the female nude than the male, with figures of smooth form and waxy texture.

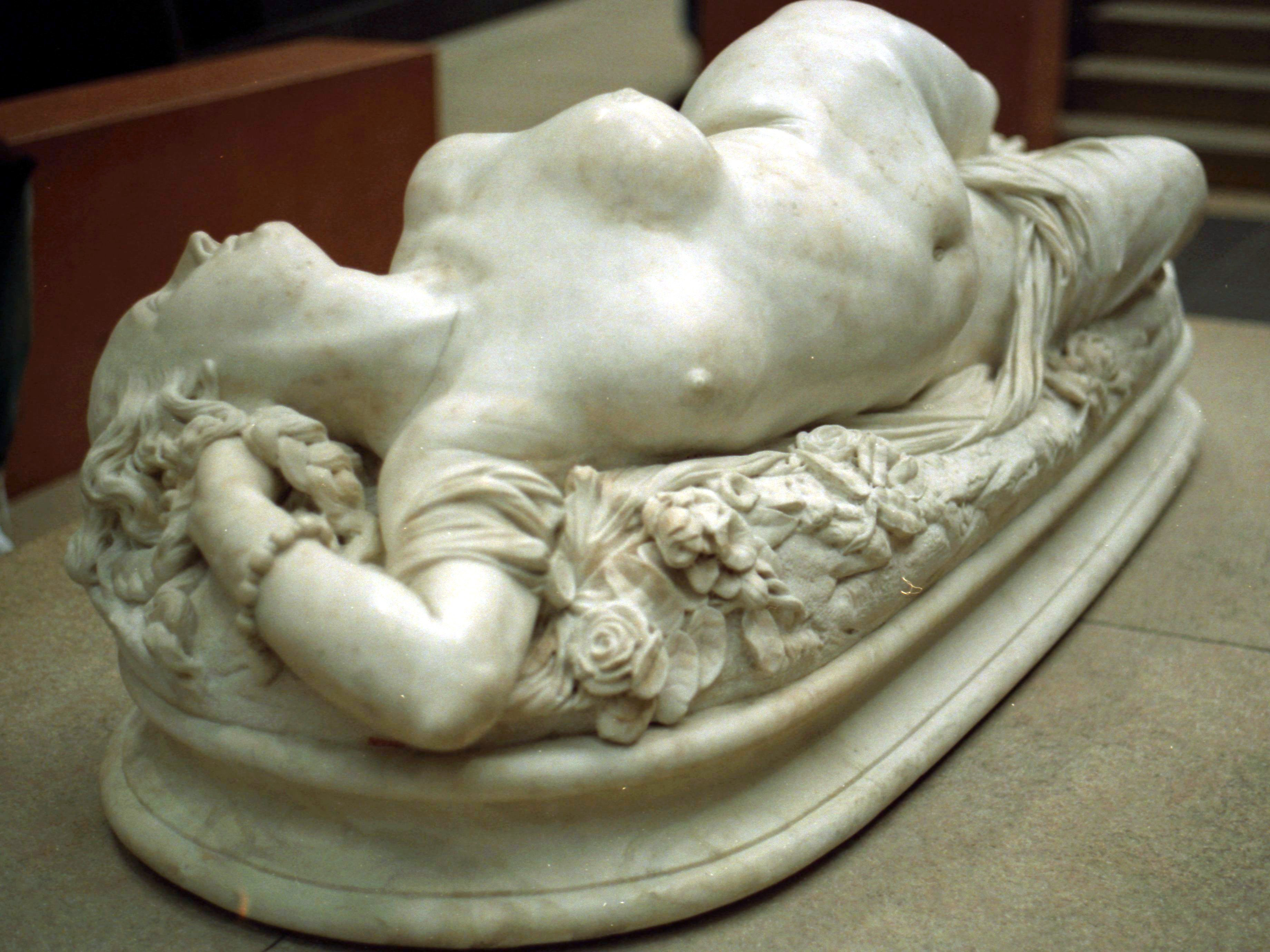
Woman Bitten by a Snake (1847), by Auguste Clésinger, Musée d'Orsay, Paris.

One of the main representatives of academicism was William-Adolphe Bouguereau, who produced a large number of nude works, generally on mythological themes, with figures of great anatomical perfection, pale, with long hair and a gestural elegance not without sensuality (The Birth of Venus, 1879; Dawn, 1881; The Wave, 1896; The Oreads, 1902). Another exponent was Alexandre Cabanel, author of mythological and allegorical nudes that serve as a pretext to represent women of voluptuous, sensual beauty, such as his famous The Birth of Venus (1863). The same is the case of Eùgene Emmanuel Amaury-Duval, author of another Birth of Venus (1862). Jean-Léon Gérôme was one of the main representatives of academic orientalism, with works set in harems and Turkish baths in the purest Ingresian style, as well as mythological and historical themes (Phryne before the Areopagus, 1861; Moorish Bath, 1870; Pool in a Harem, 1876; Pygmalion and Galatea, 1890). Other artists were: François-Léon Benouville (The Wrath of Achilles, 1847), Auguste Clésinger (Woman Bitten by a Snake, 1847; Leda and the Swan, 1864), Paul Baudry (The Pearl and the Wave, 1862), Jules Joseph Lefebvre (The Truth, 1870; Mary Magdalene in the Cave, 1876), Henri Gervex (Rolla, 1878), Édouard Debat-Ponsan (Le massage au Hamam, 1883), Alexandre Jacques Chantron (Danae, 1891), Gaston Bussière (The Nereids, 1902), Guillaume Seignac (The Awakening of Psyche, 1904), etc.

In Great Britain, Victorian society encouraged academicism as an official art that best expressed the puritanical morality prevailing in the circles of the bourgeoisie and nobility, with authors such as Joseph Noel Paton (The Quarrel of Oberon and Titania, 1846), Charles William Mitchell (Hypatia, 1885), Frederic Leighton (Psyche in the Bath, 1890), John Collier (Lilith, 1887; Lady Godiva, 1898; Tannhäuser on the Venusberg, 1901), Edward Poynter (Diadumene, 1884; Cave of the Storm Nymphs, 1903), Lawrence Alma-Tadema (A Favourite Custom, 1909), John William Godward (Venus at the Bath, 1901; In the Tepidarium, 1913; Nude on the Beach, 1922), Herbert James Draper (Ulysses and the Sirens, 1909), etc.

In Spain, Luis Ricardo Falero also had a special predilection for the female figure, with works where the fantastic component and orientalist taste stand out: Oriental Beauty (1877), The Vision of Faust (Witches going to their Sabbath) (1878), Enchantress (1878), The pose (1879), The Favorite (1880), Twin stars (1881), Lily Fairy (1888), The Butterfly (1893), etc.

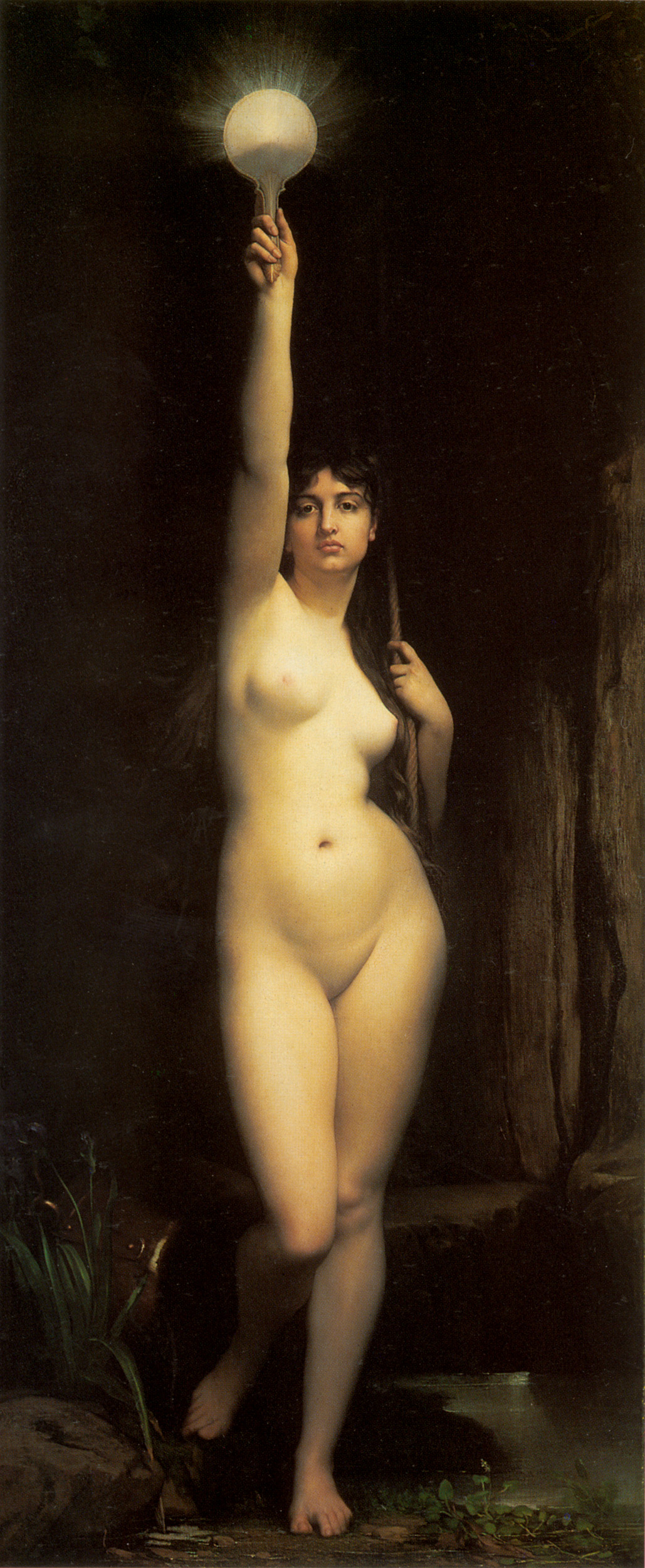
The Truth (1870), by Jules Joseph Lefebvre, Musée d'Orsay, Paris.

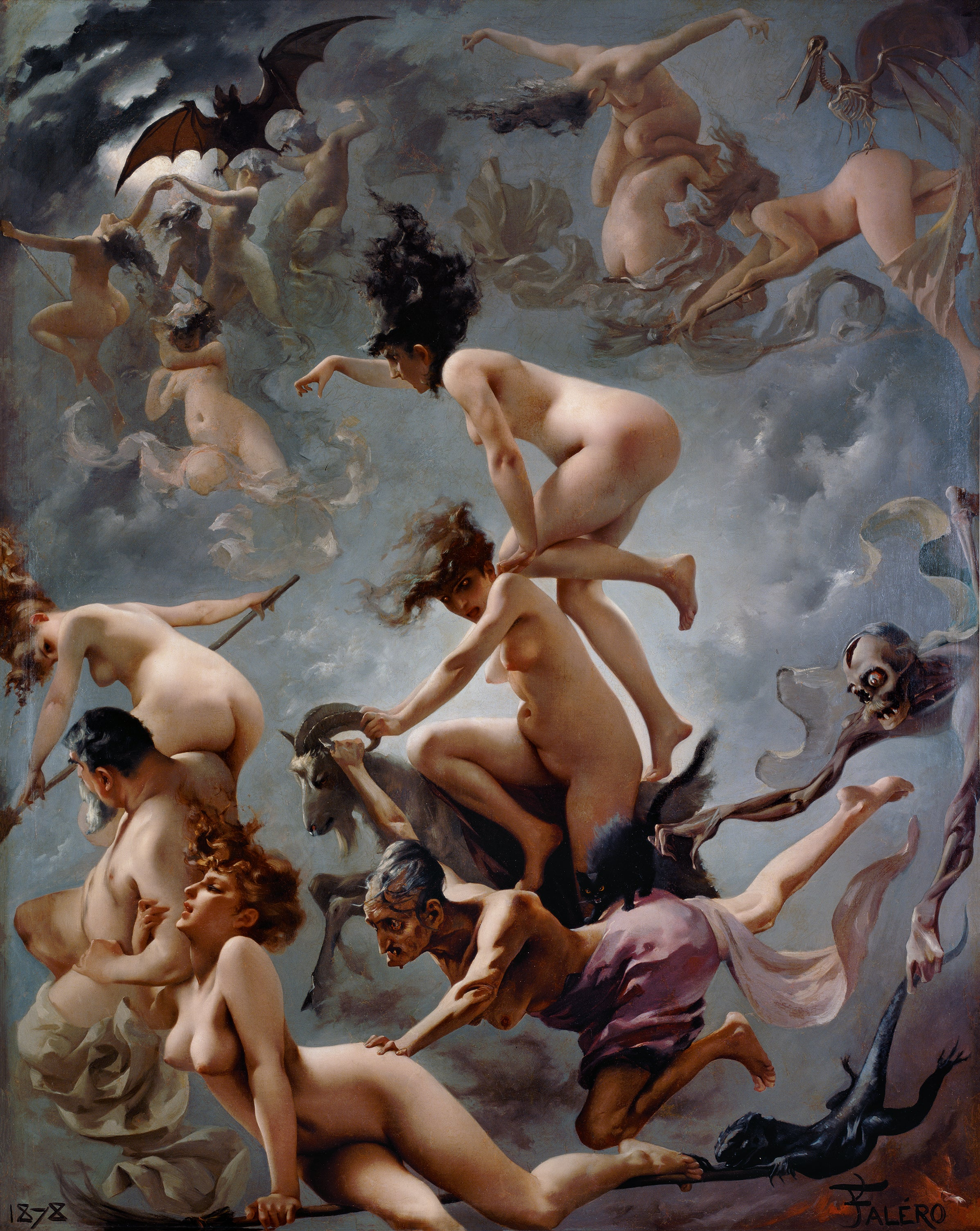
Witches going to their Sabbath (1878), by Luis Ricardo Falero.

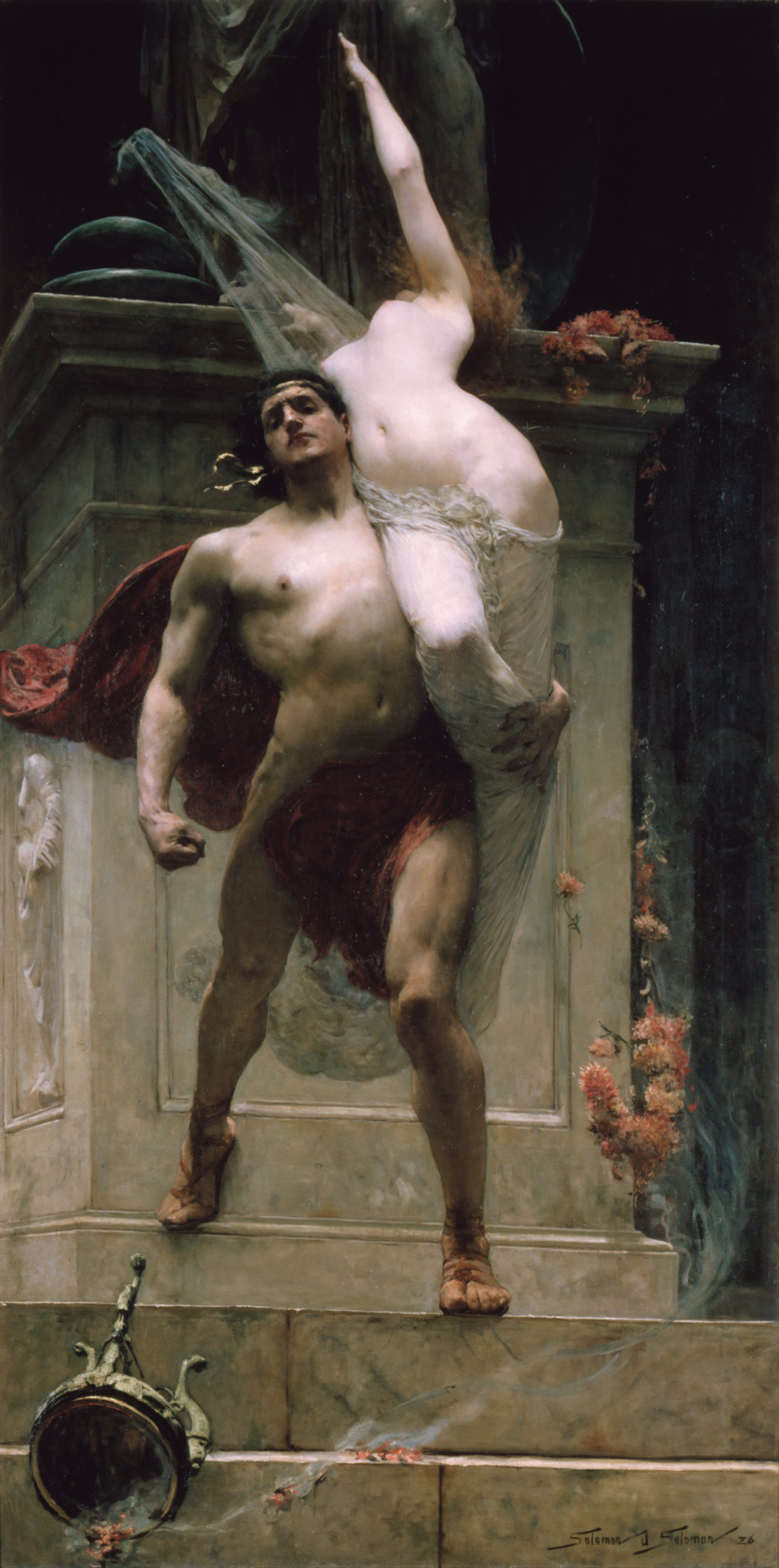
Ajax and Cassandra (1886), by Solomon Joseph Solomon, Art Gallery of Ballarat.

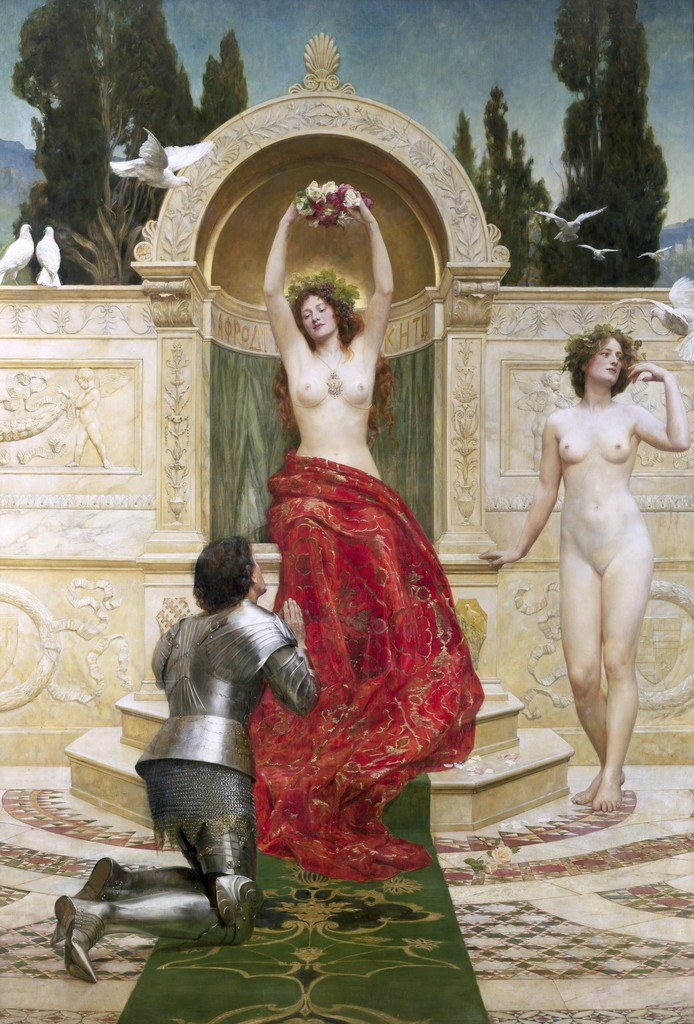
In the Venusberg (1901), by John Collier.

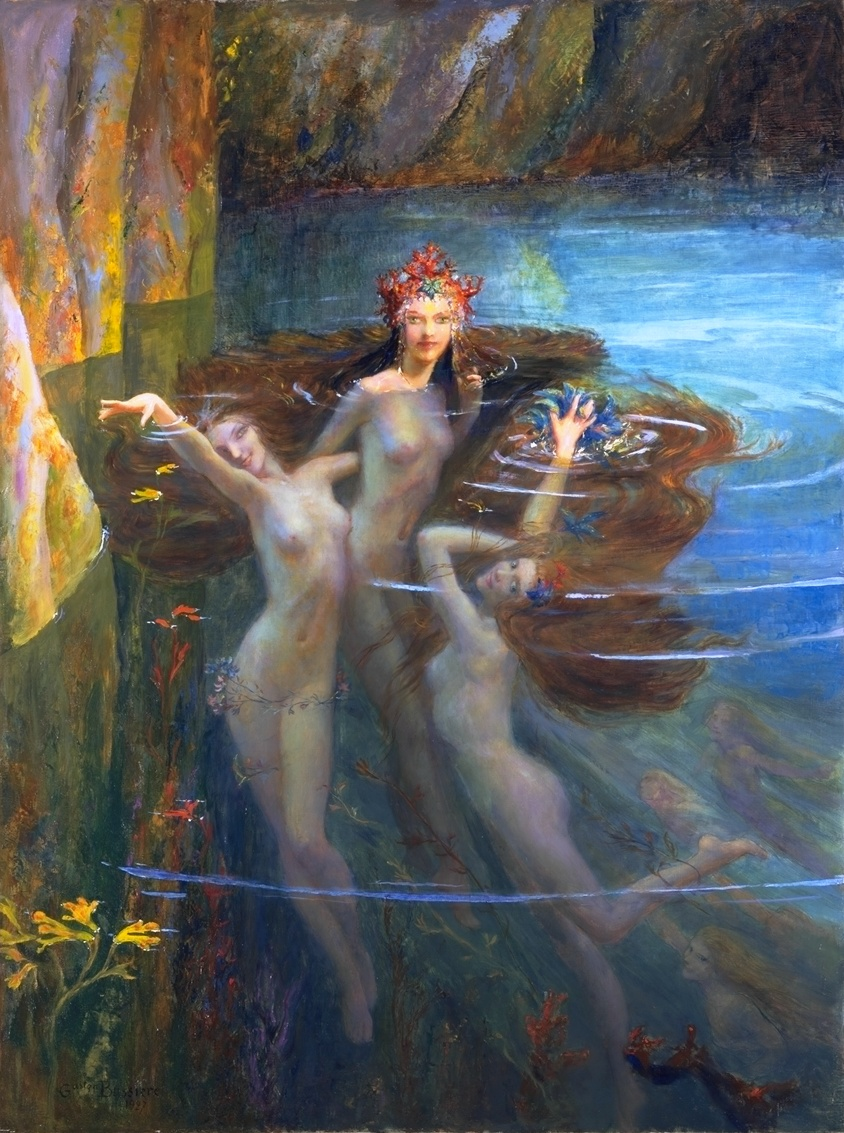
The Nereids (1902), by Gaston Bussière, Private collection.

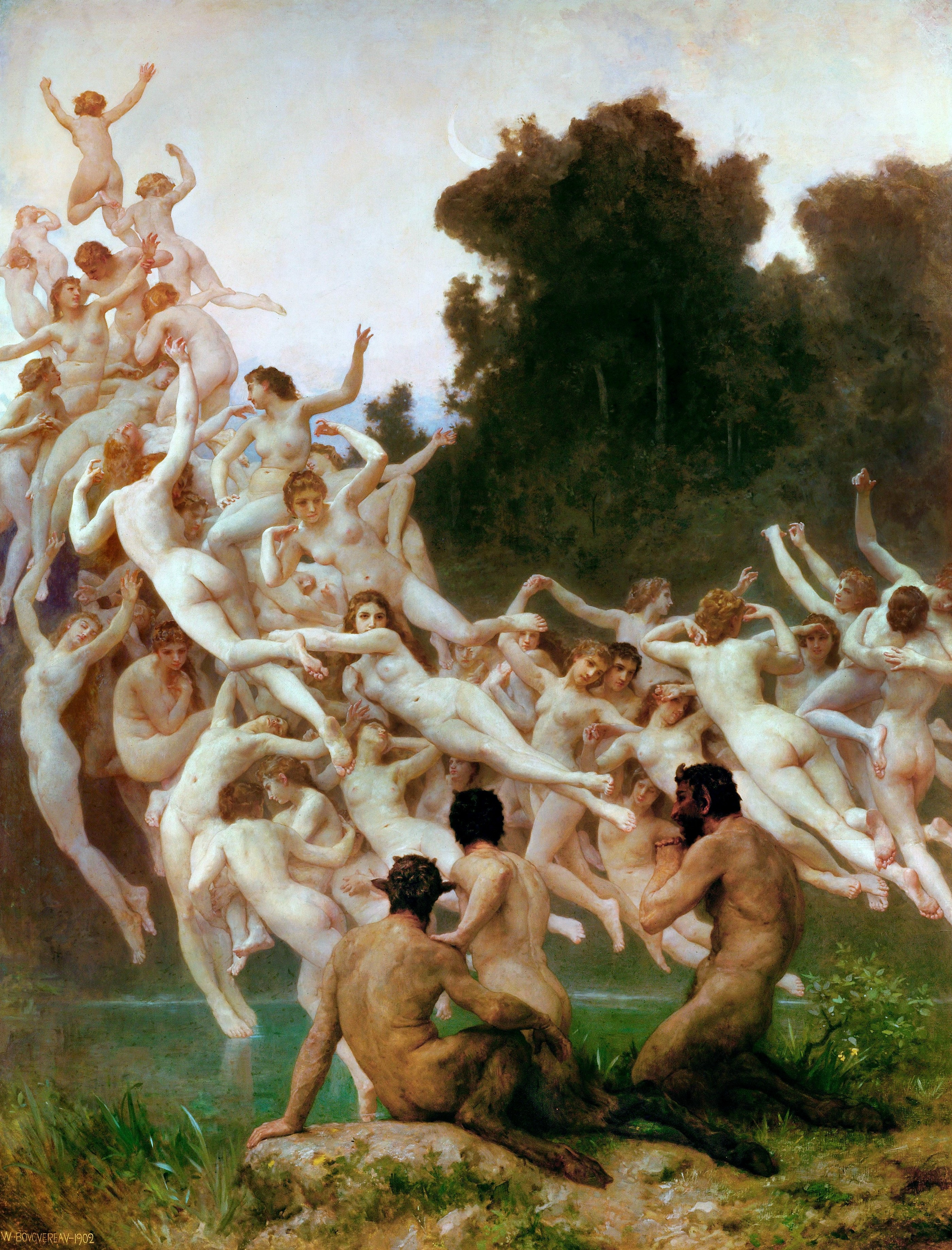
Les Oréades (1902), by William-Adolphe Bouguereau, Private Collection.

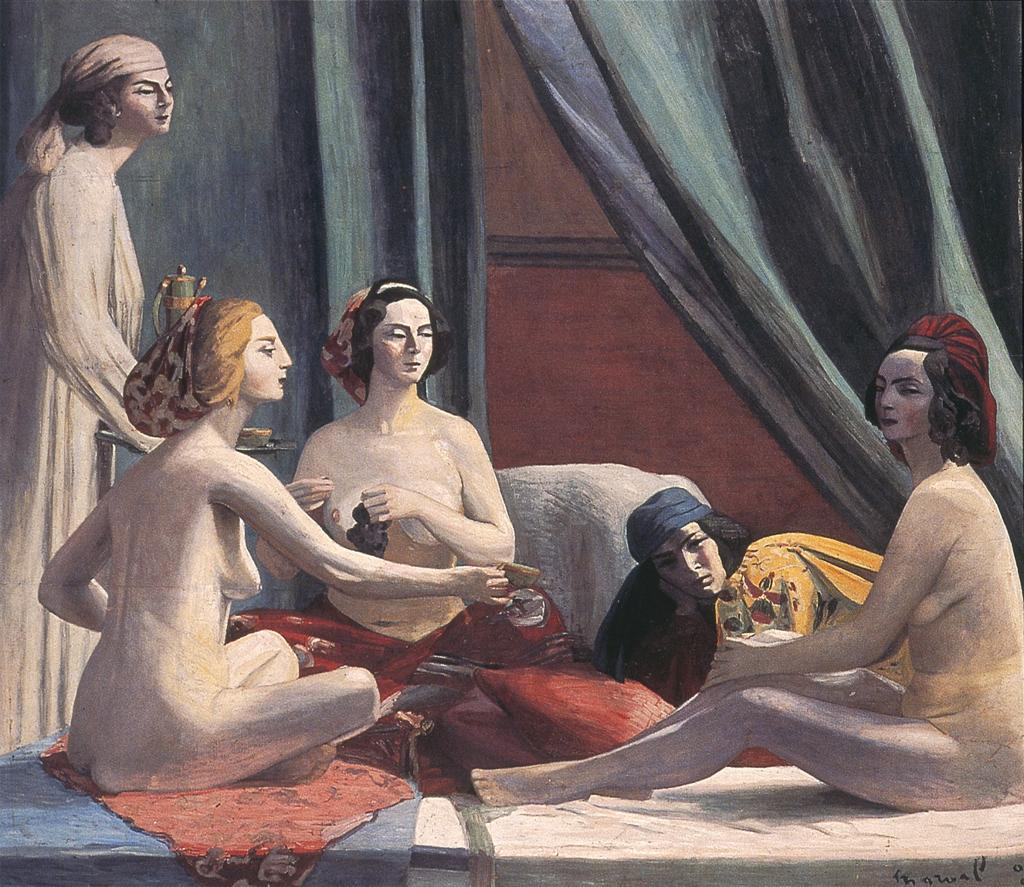
The Odalisques (1902-1903), by Jacqueline Marval, Museum of Grenoble.

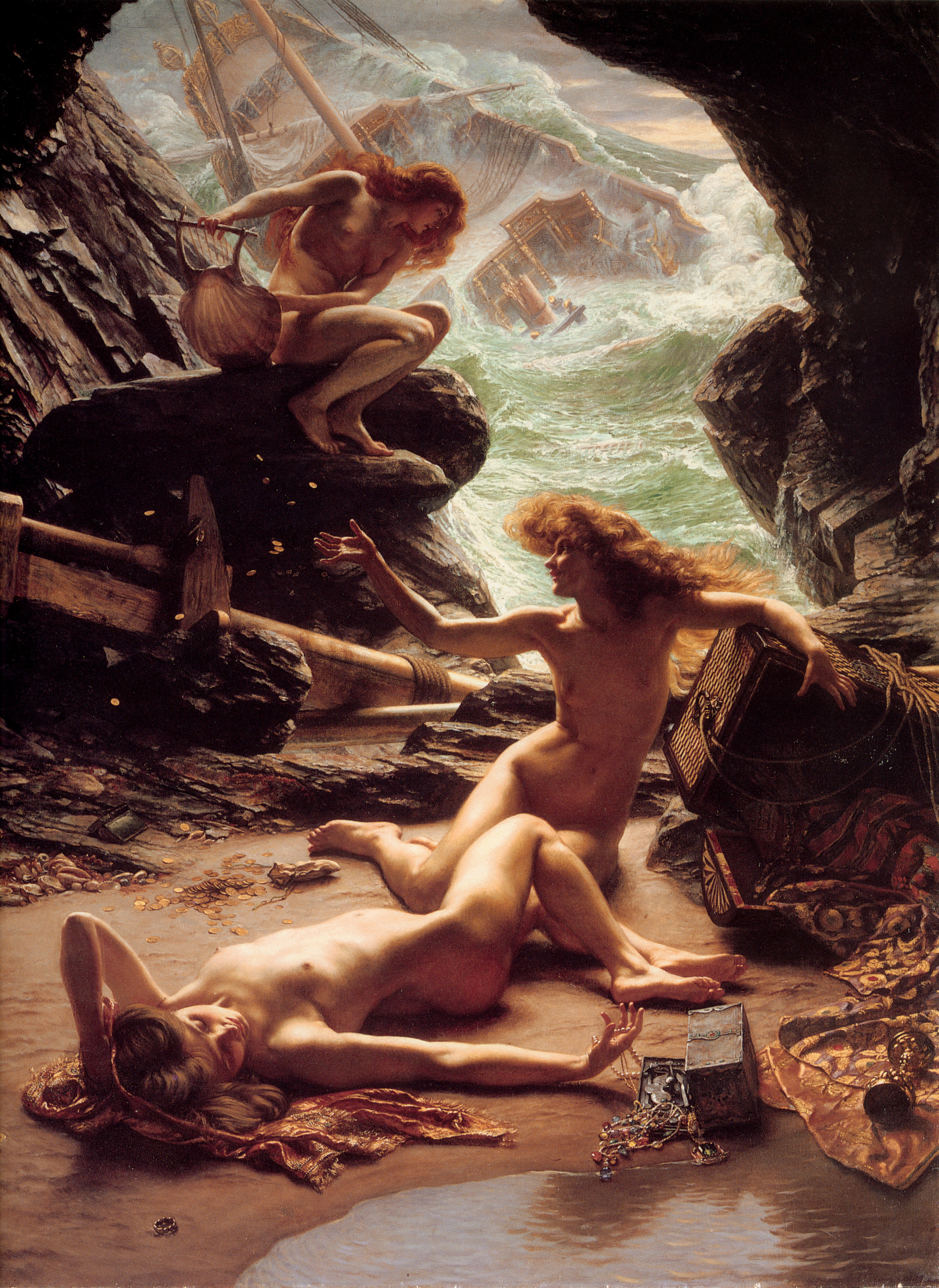
Cave of the Storm Nymphs (1903), by Edward Poynter, Private Collection.

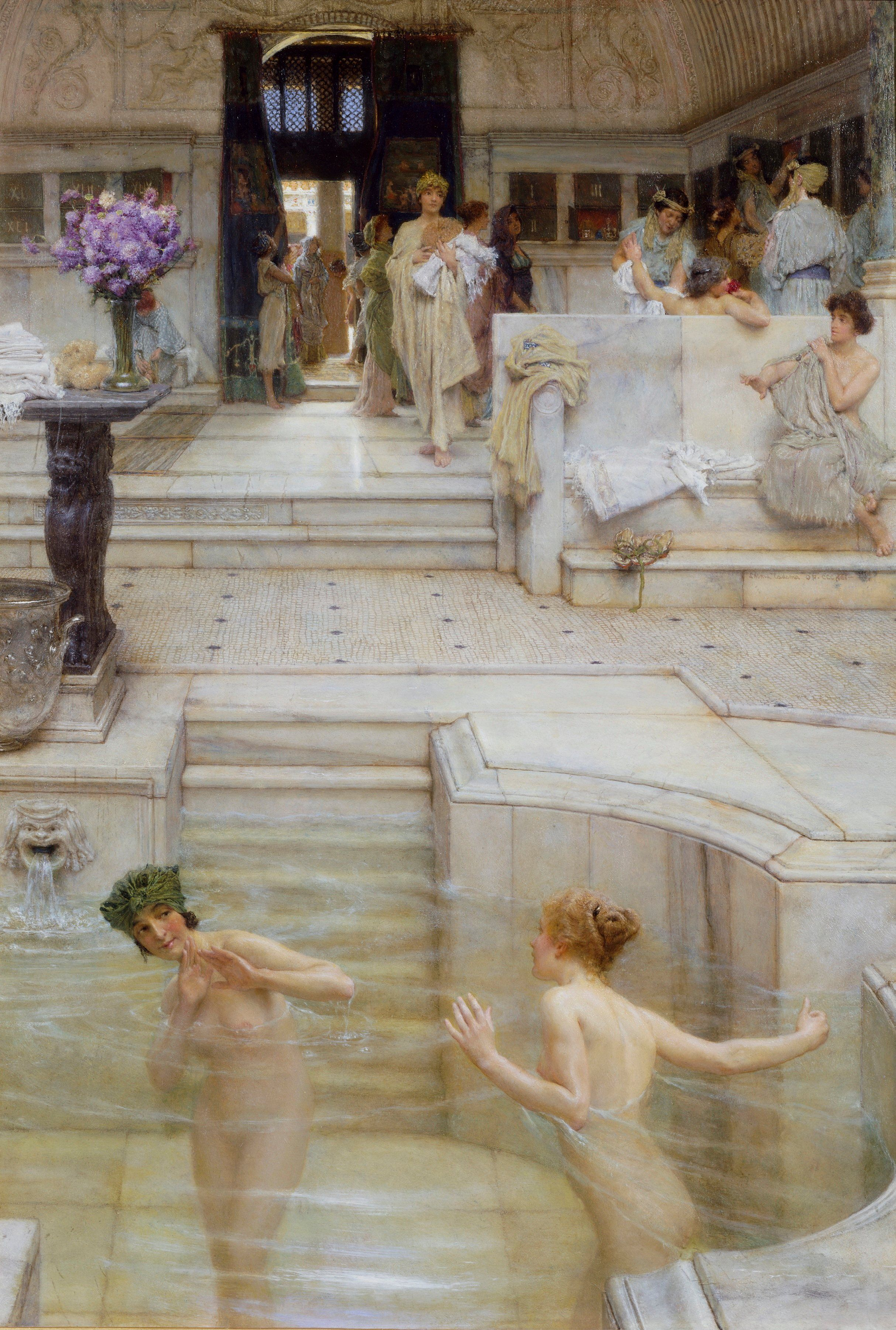
A Favourite Custom (1909), by Lawrence Alma-Tadema, Tate Gallery, London.

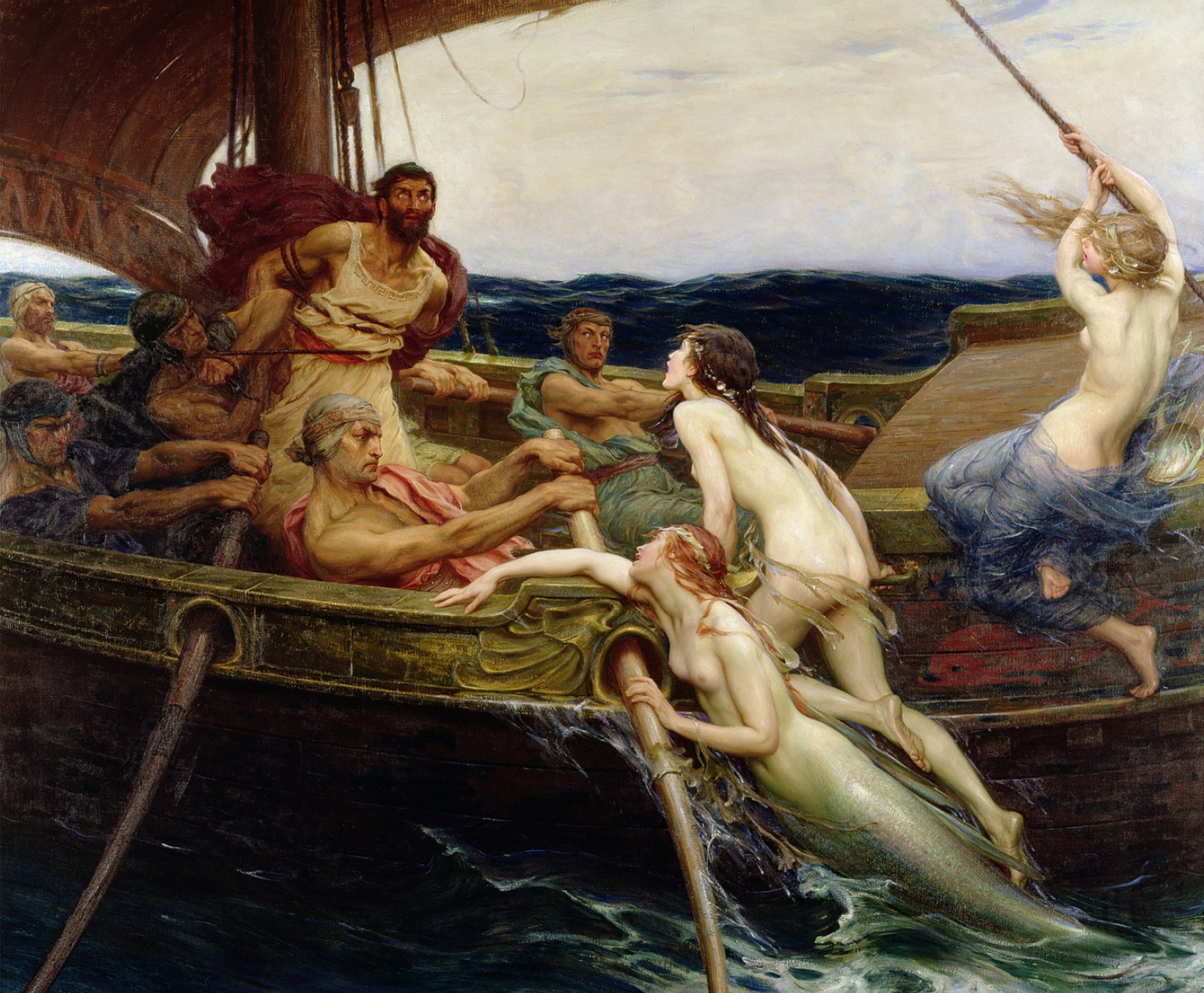
Ulysses and the Sirens (1909), by Herbert James Draper, Ferens Art Gallery, Kingston upon Hull.

==== Realism ====
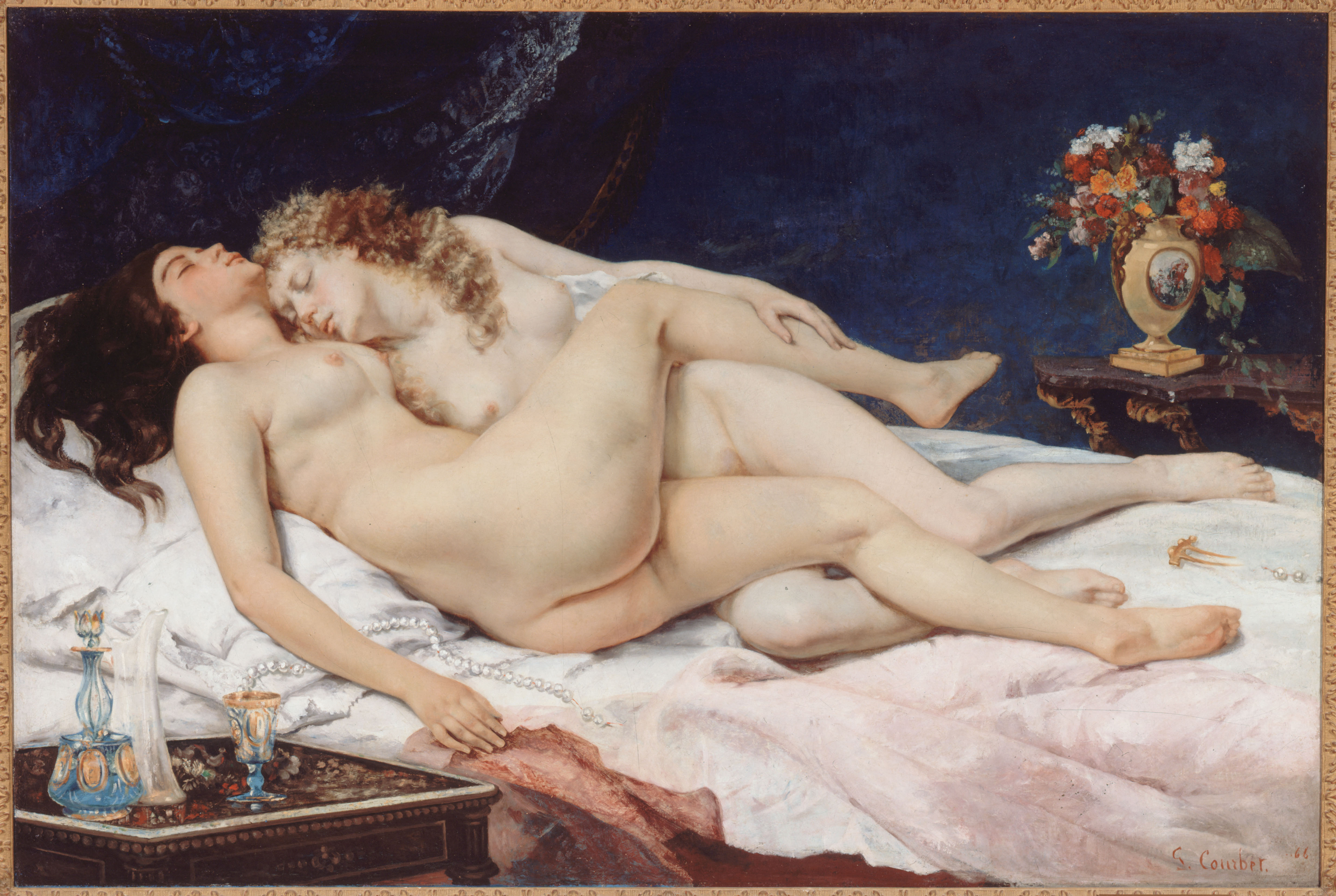
The Sleepers (1866), by Gustave Courbet, Musée du Petit-Palais, Paris.

From the middle of the century, a trend emerged that emphasized reality, the description of the surrounding world, especially of workers and peasants in the new framework of the industrial era, with a certain component of social denunciation, linked to political movements such as utopian socialism and philosophical movements such as positivism. In the context of the dissolution of the classical theory of art that took place in the first half of the 19th century, realism, together with the technical liberation brought about by the appearance of photography, which inspired many of the new artists, meant a thematic liberation, where the protagonists were no longer nobles, heroes or gods, but ordinary people, from the street, portrayed in all their misery and crudeness.

Its main exponent was Gustave Courbet, an artist with a passionate and politically committed temperament, determined to overcome the "errors of the Romantics and classicists". Courbet's work introduced realism into the nude, which, although in previous times had had more or less naturalistic approaches, was generally subordinated to an idealizing conception of the human body. Courbet was the first to portray the body as he perceived it, without idealizing, contextualizing, or framing it within an iconographic theme, transcribing the forms he captured from nature. Generally, his models were of robust constitution, like The Bathers (1853), the model of The Painter's Studio (1855), Nude Woman Lying Down (1862), Woman with a Parrot (1865), Lot and His Daughters (1844), Two Bathers (1858) and The Spring (1867). Sometimes he was inspired by other artists, as in The Fountain (1868)—a replica of the famous work by Ingres—or The Sleepers (1866), which recalls The Two Girl Friends by Fragonard. One of his most famous works is The Origin of the World (1866), where he presents a female body without a head, showing the pubis in the foreground, in a radically novel vision that surprised and scandalized the public of the time.

Another exponent was Camille Corot, who was primarily a landscape painter, occasionally adding human figures to his landscapes, some of them nudes, in a type of landscapes with an Arcadian air, with vaporous atmospheres and delicate tones, as in Reclining Nymph (1855) and Nymph on the Seashore (1860). Later, he dissociated the landscape from the human figure, and between 1865 and 1875, he produced numerous works focused on the female figure, such as Interrupted Reading (1865–1870) and Woman with a Pearl (1869). Other works of his are: Marietta, the Roman Odalisque (1843), Girl with the Pink Skirt (1853–1865), The Bath of Diana (1855), The Dance of the Nymphs (1857), etc.

The sculptural equivalent of realism was Constantin Meunier, who preferentially portrayed workers and laborers of the new industrial era, replacing the classical hero by the modern proletarian, in works where special relevance is given to the volumetric sense of the figure, as in The Puddler (1885) and The Elder, in the Monument to Labor in Brussels (1890–1905). Another notable sculptor was Aimé-Jules Dalou, a disciple of Carpeaux, who despite his naturalism denotes a certain baroque influence, in works such as Bacchanal (1891), Bather Drying Her Foot (1895) and The Triumph of Silenus (1898).

The American settled in Europe, John Singer Sargent, considered one of the most successful portraitists of his time, was also a painter of landscapes and a draughtsman, leaving a large number of academies. Influenced by Velázquez, Frans Hals, Anthony van Dyck, and Thomas Gainsborough, he had an elegant and virtuous style, which he demonstrated in nudes such as Nude Boy on the Beach (1878) and Nicola D'Inverno (1892).

In Spain, realism also prevailed in the middle of the century: Eduardo Rosales worked across numerous genres, and although he made few nudes (Sleeping Woman, 1862; After Bathingo, 1869), they merit attention for their quality. Of Raimundo Madrazo, it is also worth mentioning a single work, After the Bath (1895), of admirable design and compositional sense. Mariano Fortuny, trained in Nazarenism, made several works of oriental themes (The Odalisque, 1861), along with genre scenes or nudes set in landscapes (Idyll, 1868; Choice of a Model, 1870–1874; Nude Old Man in the Sun, 1871; Carmen Bastian, 1871–1872; Nude on the beach of Portici, 1874). Other artists were: Casto Plasencia (The Rape of the Sabine Women, 1874), José Jiménez Aranda (A Slave for Sale, 1897), Enrique Simonet (Anatomy of the heart, 1890; The Judgment of Paris, 1904) and, as a sculptor, Ricardo Bellver (El ángel caído, 1877).

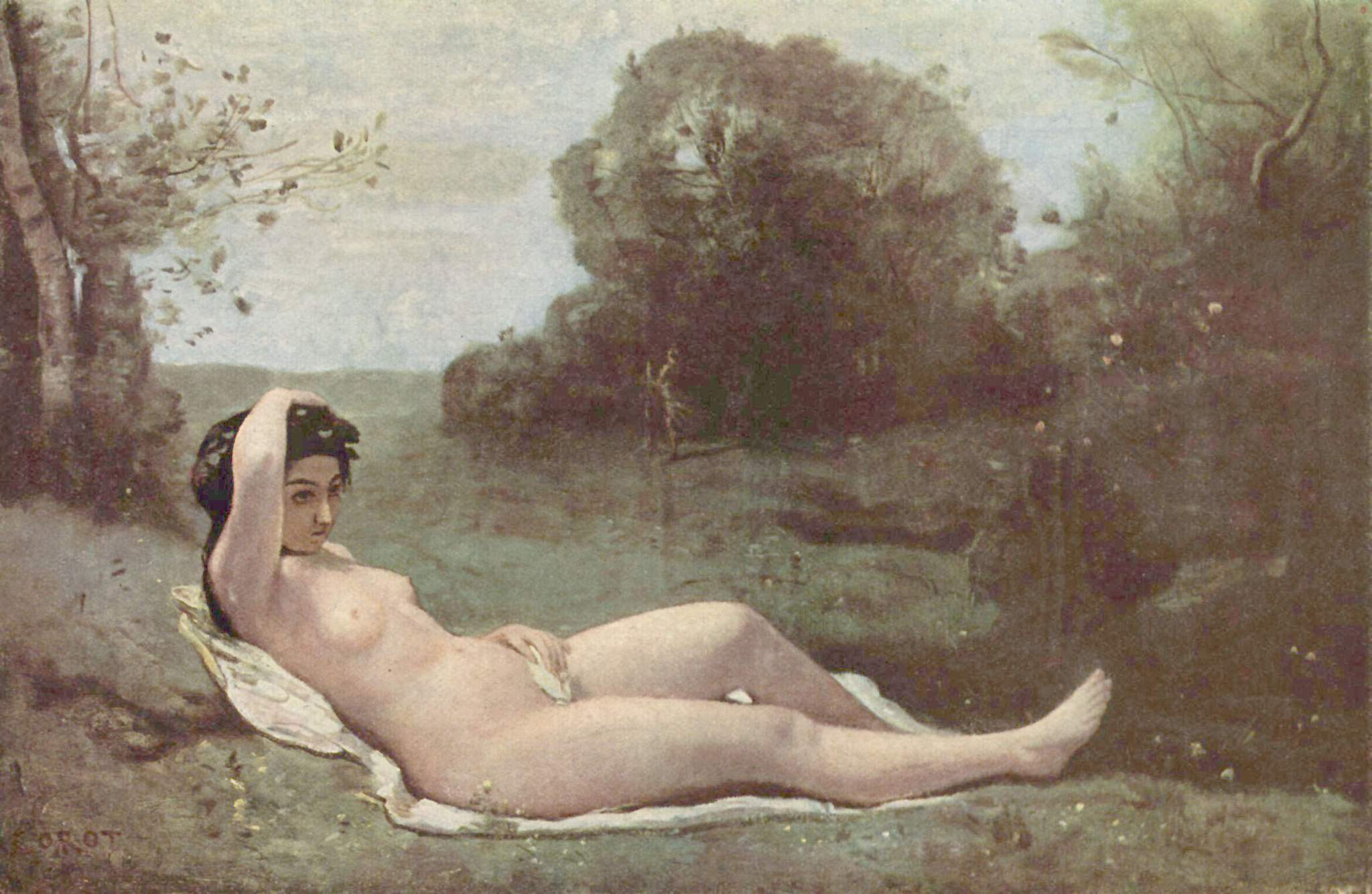
Young Girl in Green (1859), by Camille Corot, Musée d'Art et d'Histoire, Geneva.

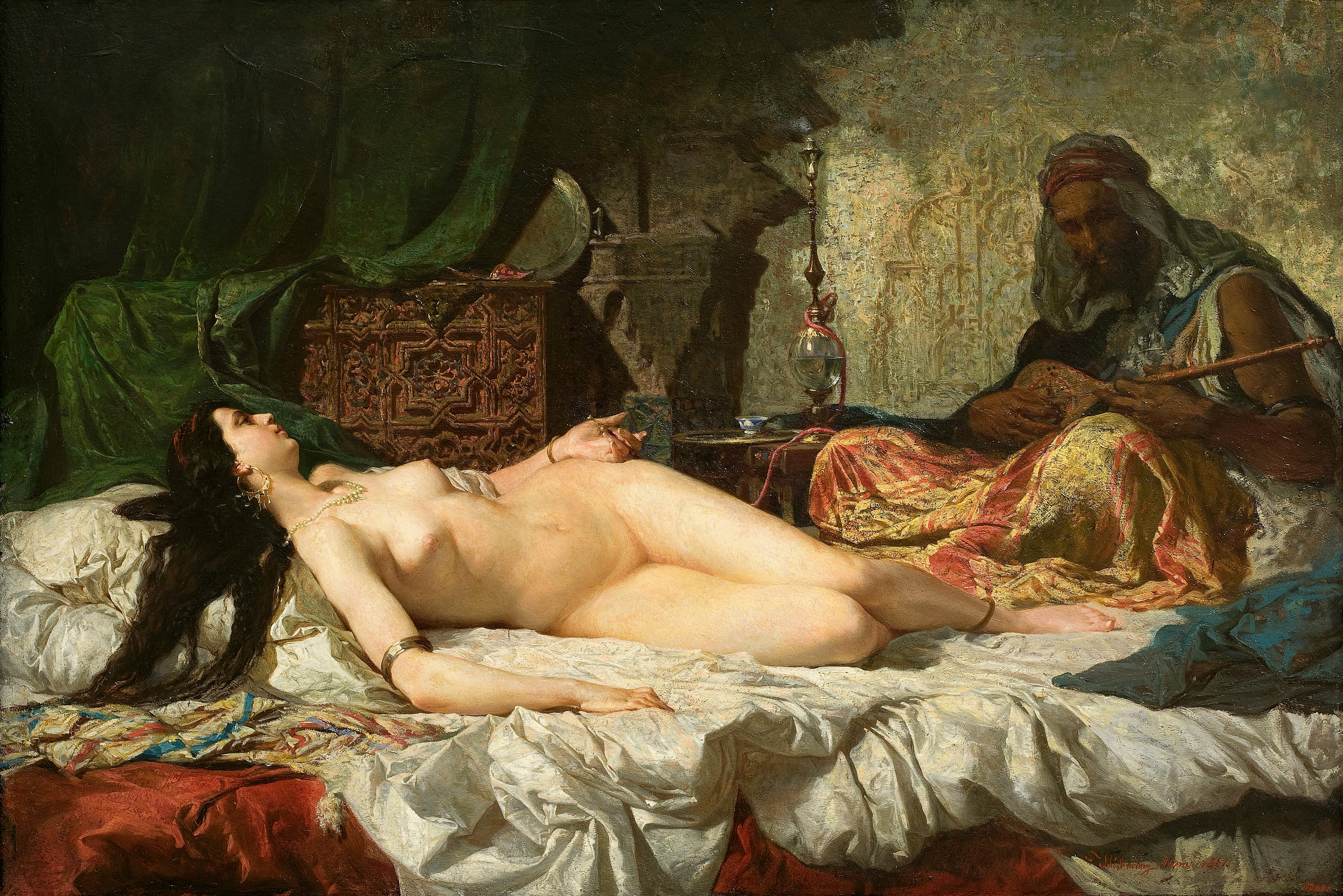
The Odalisque (1861), by Mariano Fortuny, MNAC, Barcelona.

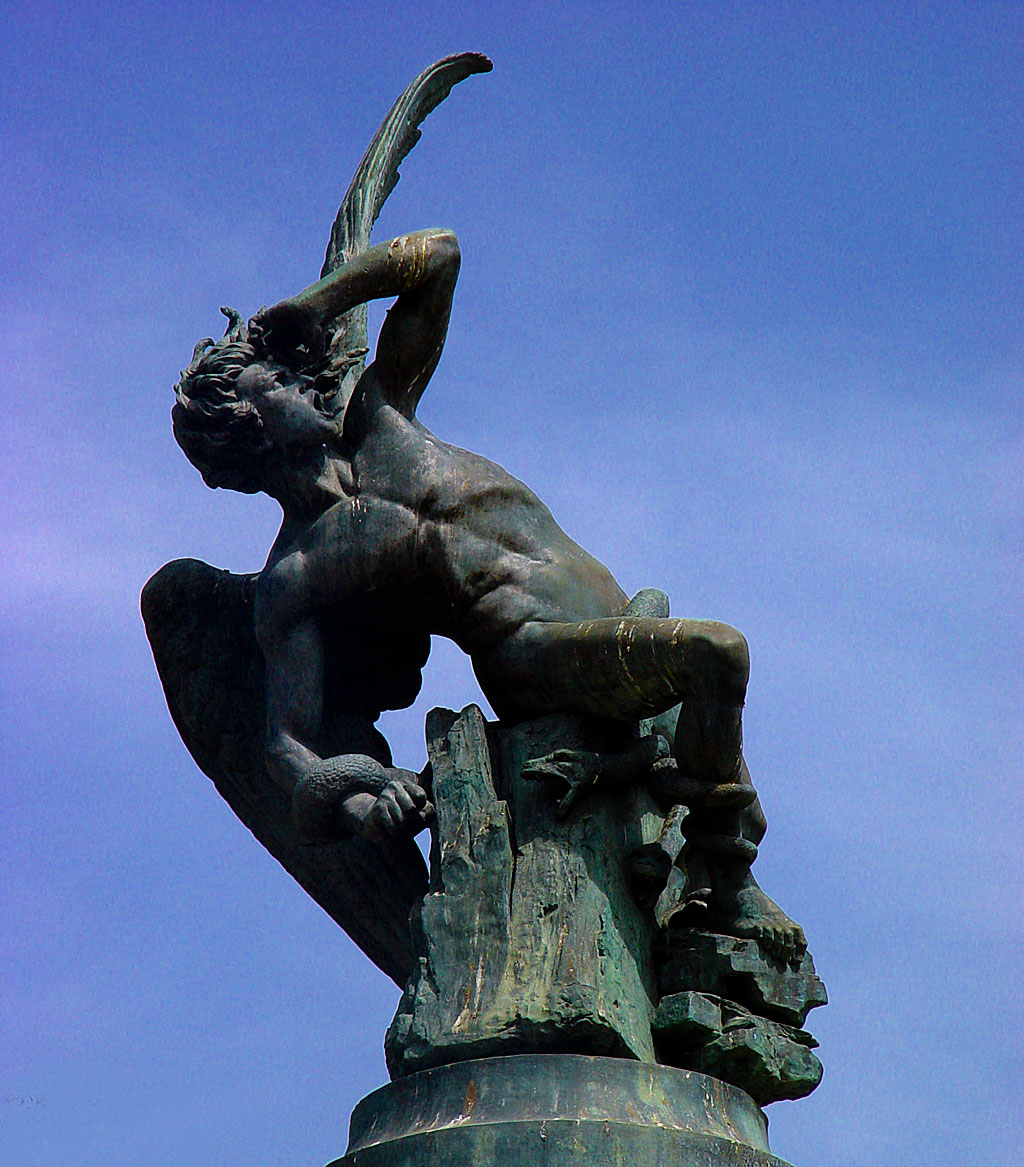
El ángel caído (1877), by Ricardo Bellver, Gardens of Buen Retiro, Madrid.

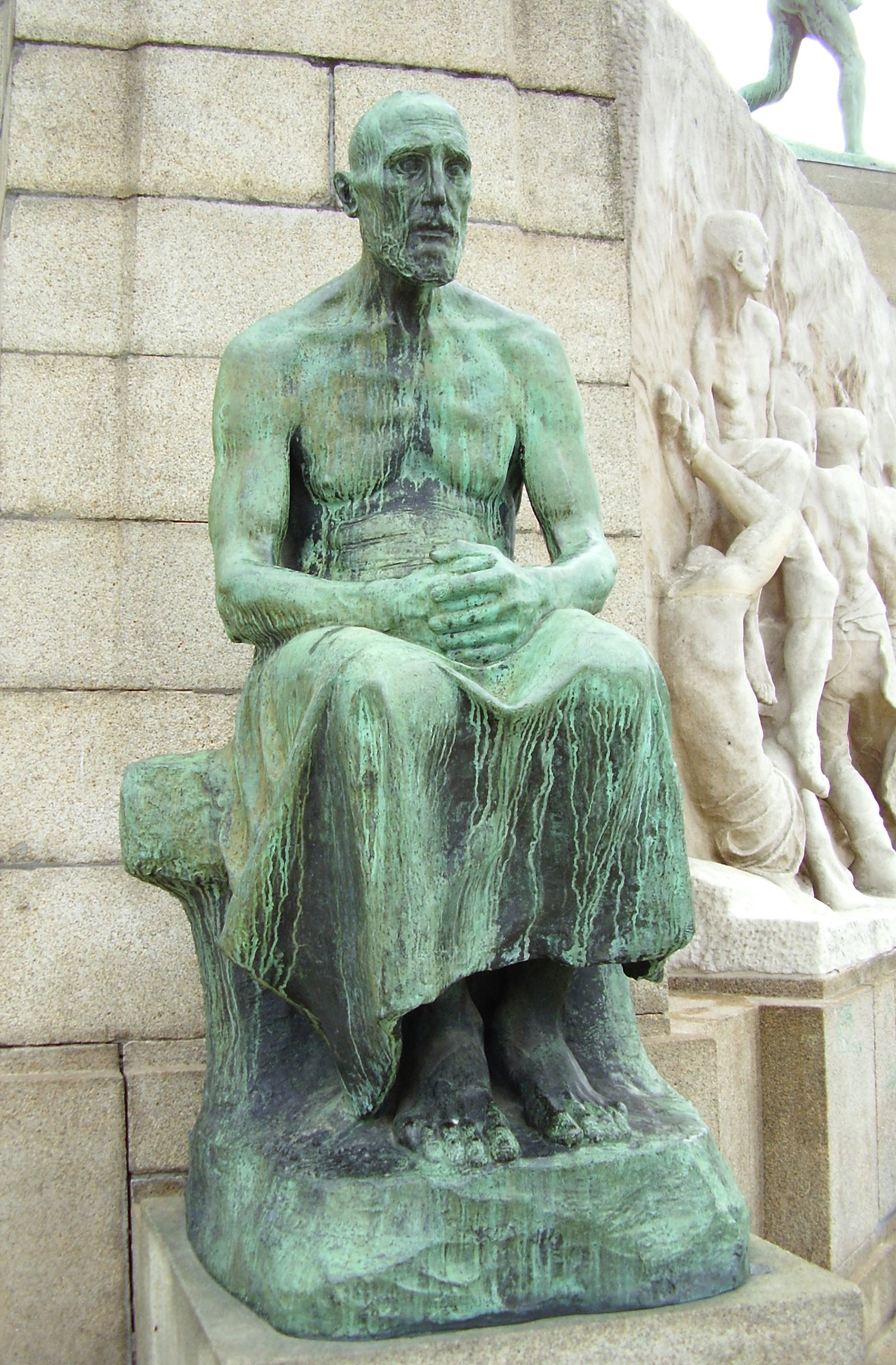
The Old Man, in the Monument to Labor (1890–1905), by Constantin Meunier, Brussels.

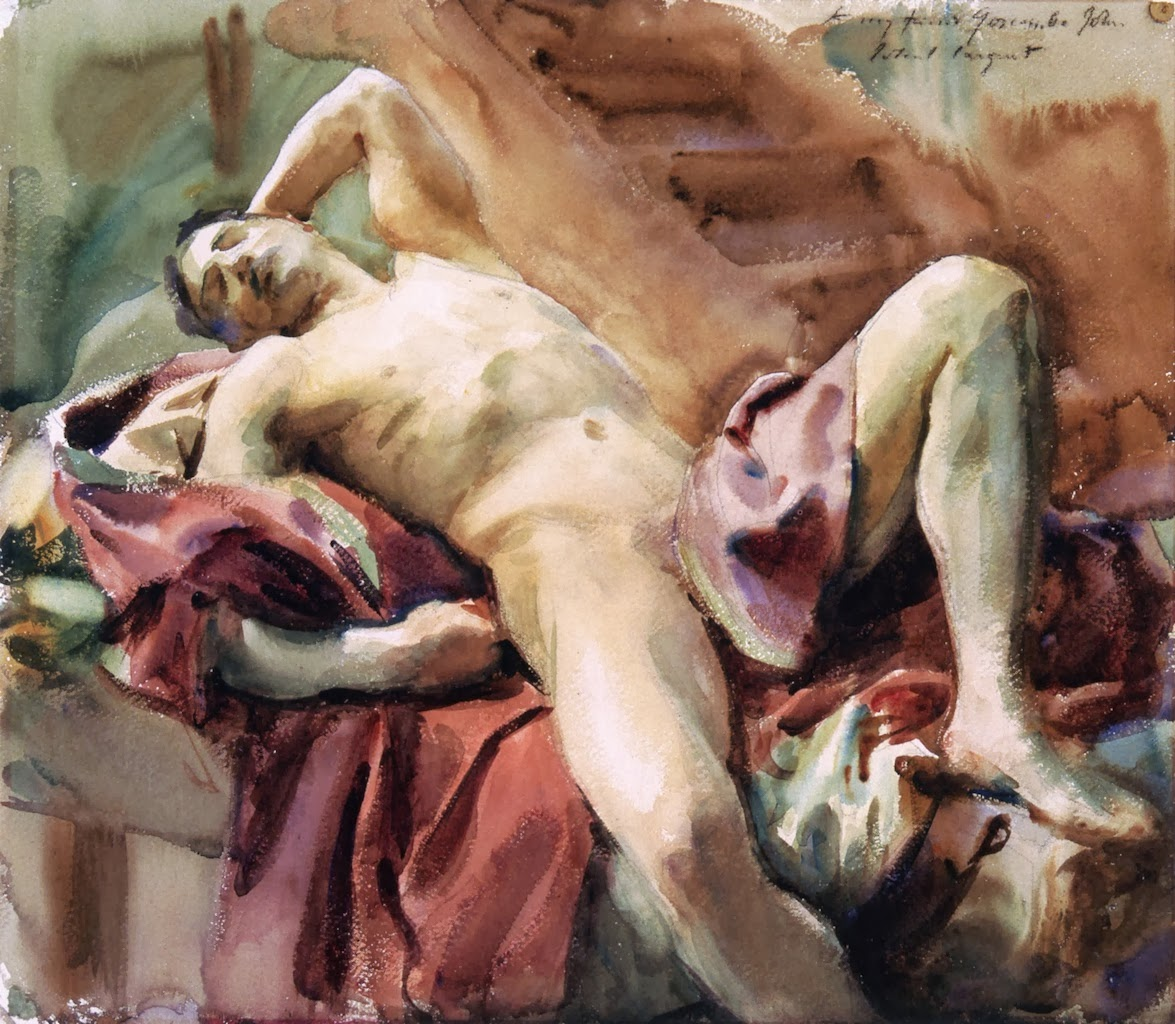
Portrait of Nicola D'Inverno (1892), by John Singer Sargent.

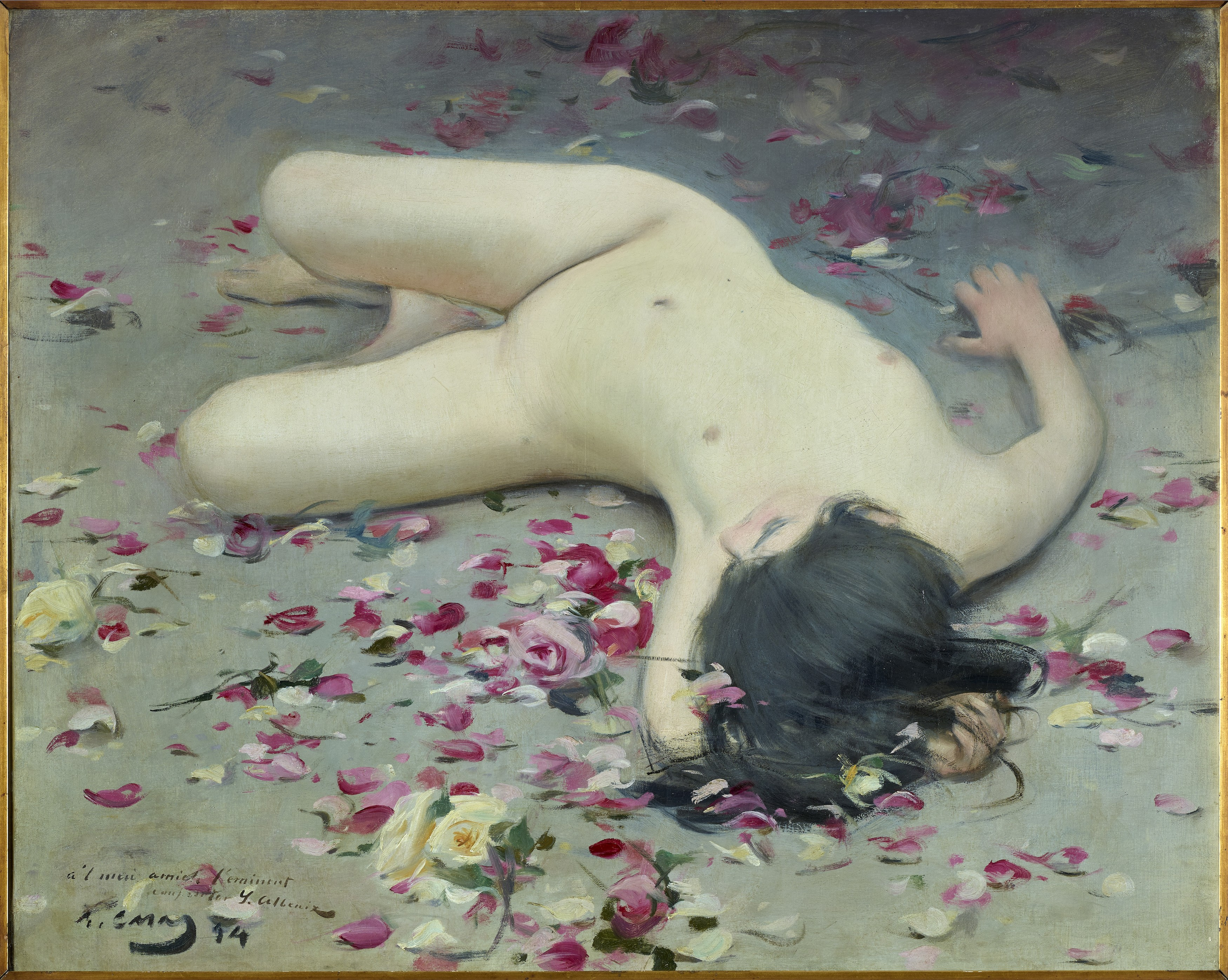
Leafless Flowers (es) (1894), by Ramón Casas

==== Impressionism ====
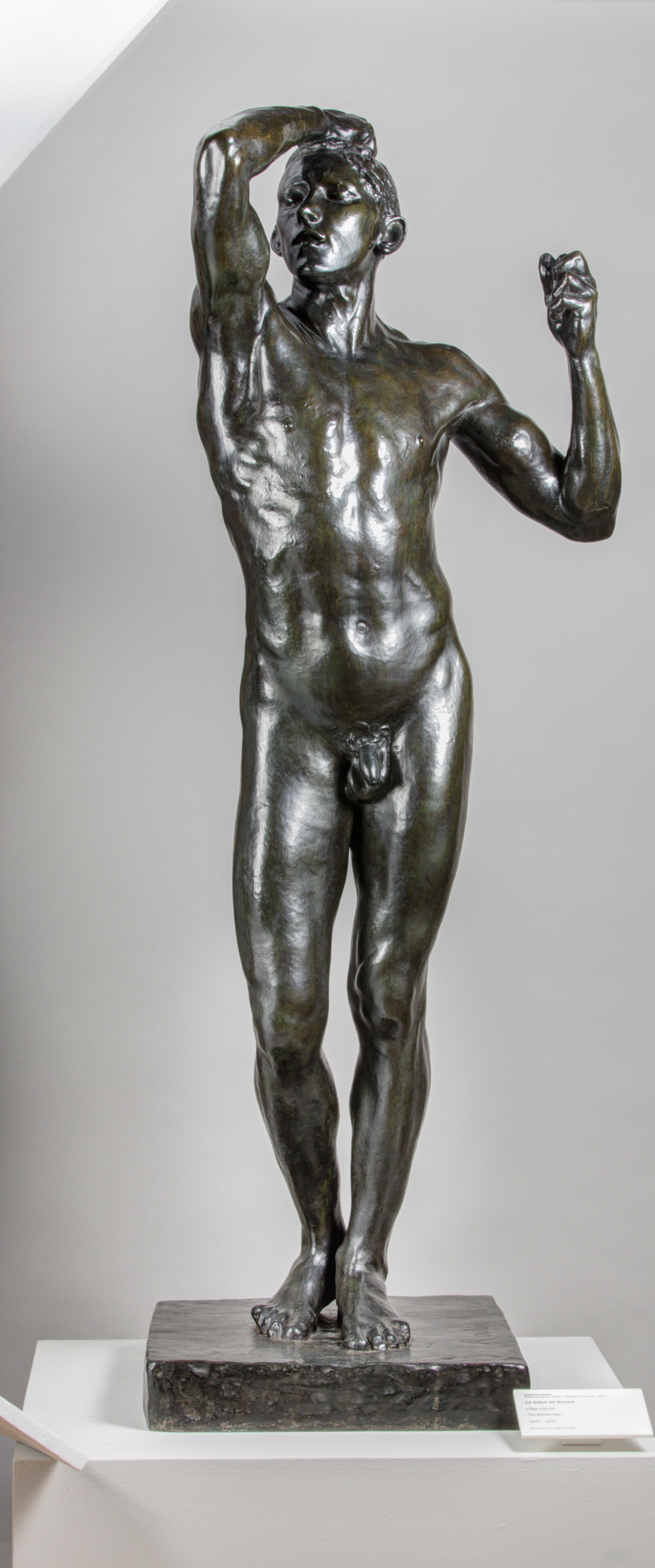
The Age of Bronze, de Auguste Rodin (1877)

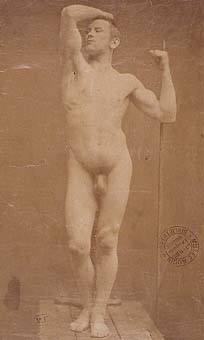
Auguste Neyt, model of The Age of Bronze, photograph by Gaudenzio Marconi.

Impressionism was a profoundly innovative movement that marked a break with academic art and a transformation of artistic language, initiating the path towards avant-garde movements. The Impressionists were inspired by nature, seeking to capture a visual "impression" —an instant on the canvas—under the influence of photography, using loose brushstrokes and clear, luminous tones, especially valuing light.

The work of the Impressionists was of great rupture with the classical tradition, conceiving a new pictorial style that sought its inspiration in nature, away from all conventionalism and any classical or academic regulation. Thus, Édouard Manet's Le Déjeuner sur l'herbe (1863) was in its day a complete scandal, despite being clearly influenced by the classical contours of Raphael, although the controversy did not come from the nude itself, but from being an unjustified nude, an anonymous, contemporary woman. Another revolution promoted by Manet was his Olympia (1863), with a Caravaggesque air that gave it an aspect of delicate affectation, but whose appearance of verisimilitude caused a scandal in its time, which forced the author to leave Paris. Olympia is a real woman, flesh and blood—shamelessly real, since she represents a prostitute—and she is in a real setting, not in a bucolic forest or picturesque ruins. It is an intimate scene that shows the viewer the most private facet of the human being: his intimacy. On the other hand, the concrete and individualized features of the model give her an identity of her own, far from the idealized faces of the classical nude.

Other authors continued the path initiated by Manet, such as Edgar Degas, who, after some early Ingresian-influenced nudes, evolved to a personal style based on drawing design, essentially concerned with the transcription of movement, in scenes full of life and spontaneity. Degas voluntarily moved away from the conventional canons of beauty, opting for an undeveloped, adolescent body type, as seen in Young Spartans (1860) and his depictions of dancers. On the other hand, his works have a marked character of snapshot, of moment captured spontaneously, influenced by photography and Japanese prints, with a certain component of voyeurism (Woman in the bath, 1880; After the bath, 1883; Woman drying her foot, 1886; La toilette, 1886; After the bath, woman drying her neck, 1895). Degas initiated a subgenre within the nude, that of the toilette, women in the bathroom, performing their personal hygiene, which would have great development in the late nineteenth and early twentieth centuries. In his Series of nudes of women bathing, washing, drying themselves, combing their hair or being combed, presented at the last exhibition of the Impressionists, in 1886, he tried to offer a new vision of the nude, shown from the side or from behind, but not from the front, to emphasize the effect of a stolen instant, and so that it does not seem that they are presenting themselves to the public; in his own words: "until now the nude had been presented in postures that presupposed an audience. But my women are simple, honest people, who only take care of their physical grooming. Here is another one: she is washing her feet and it is as if I were looking at her through the keyhole".

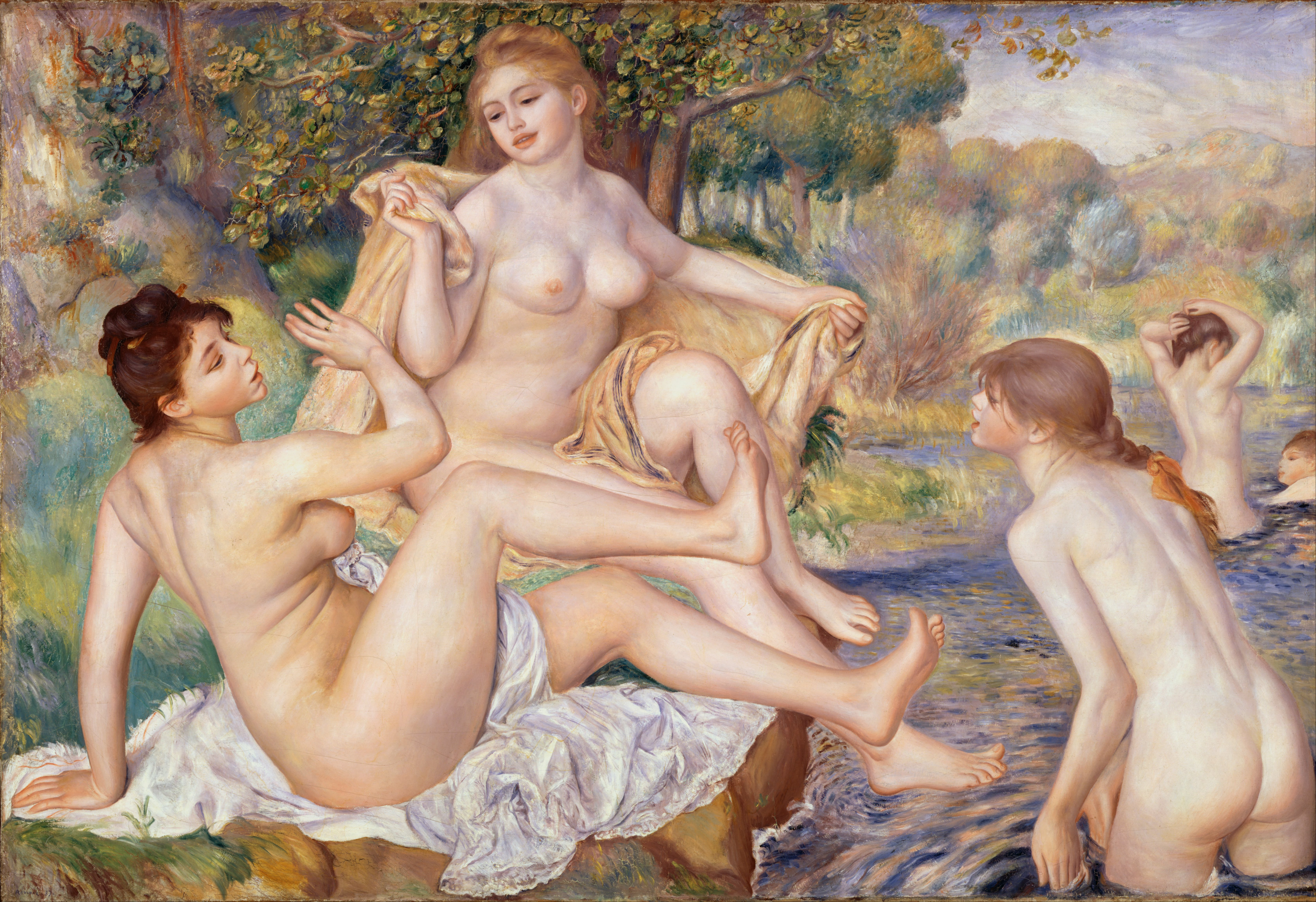
Les Grandes Baigneuses (1884–1887), by Pierre-Auguste Renoir, Philadelphia Museum of Art, Philadelphia, US.

But it was Renoir who was one of the greatest interpreters of the female body, which he transcribed in a realistic manner, but with a certain degree of adoration that conferred an air of idealized perfection. In the Baigneuse au griffon (1870), he was inspired by an engraving on the Aphrodite of Cnidus, while the compositional concept is taken from Courbet. Renoir sought to synthesize the canonical classicist posture with an air of natural reality, in luminous and evocative environments that conveyed a serene and placid vision of nudity, an ideal of communion with nature. He strove to dilute the outlines of his figures, following the impressionist technique, by mottling space with patches of light and shadow, inspired by the Venetian school, to capture form through color, as seen in Anna (1876) and Torso (1876). Later, in an attempt to simplify the nude, he was inspired by the frescoes of Raphael's La Farnesina, as well as the paintings of Pompeii and Herculaneum, as is evident in La Baigneuse blonde (1882). In the Les Grandes baigneuses (1885–1887), he painted sculptural nudes, inspired by the Fountain of the Nymphs of Girardon (Versailles), with fluid lines and a great sense of relief. In his last works he was influenced by Alexandrian Hellenism, Michelangelesque mannerism and the baroque style of Boucher and Clodion, with plump figures of exuberant appearance and natural attitude towards the body and the surrounding environment, generally rivers, lakes, forests and beaches (Seated Bathing Girl, 1885; Bathing Girl drying herself, 1895; The Judgment of Paris, 1908–1910; Bathers, 1916).

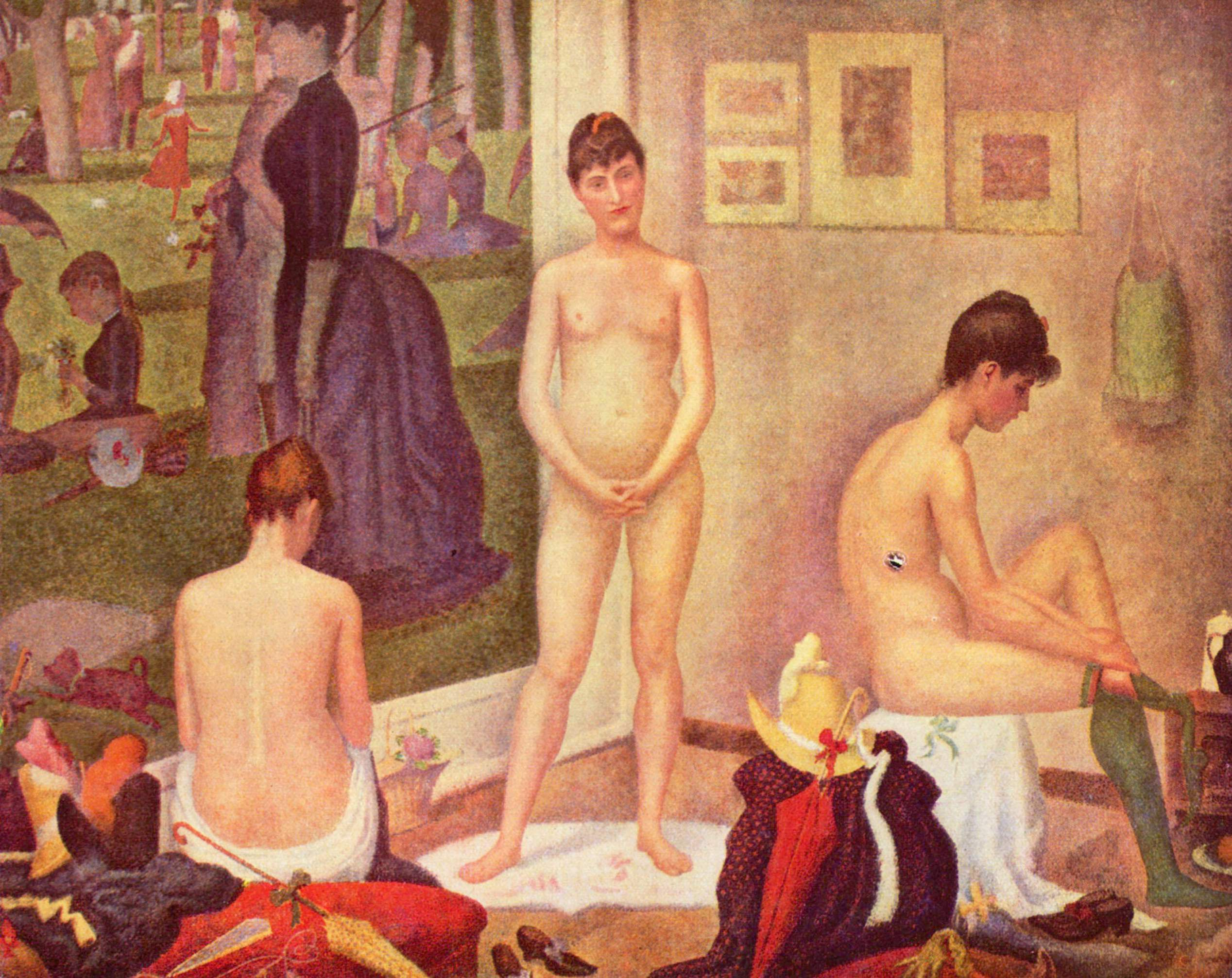
Models (1886–1888), by Georges Seurat, Barnes Foundation, Philadelphia.

Heir to Impressionism was Neo-Impressionism, a style based fundamentally on the pointillist technique, the elaboration of paintings with colored dots. One of its main representatives was Georges Seurat, who throughout his career showed a preference for various themes, such as seascapes, country scenes, the circus, the music hall and the nude. His main work in this field was Models (1886–1888), where he wanted to demonstrate that the pointillist technique was suitable for any genre, as he was often reproached for only knowing how to produce landscapes in this technique. In this work, he reinterpreted in a modern key the well-known theme of the three Graces, by means of drawing models located in the artist's own workshop, with a vision indebted in a certain way to the work of Ingres.

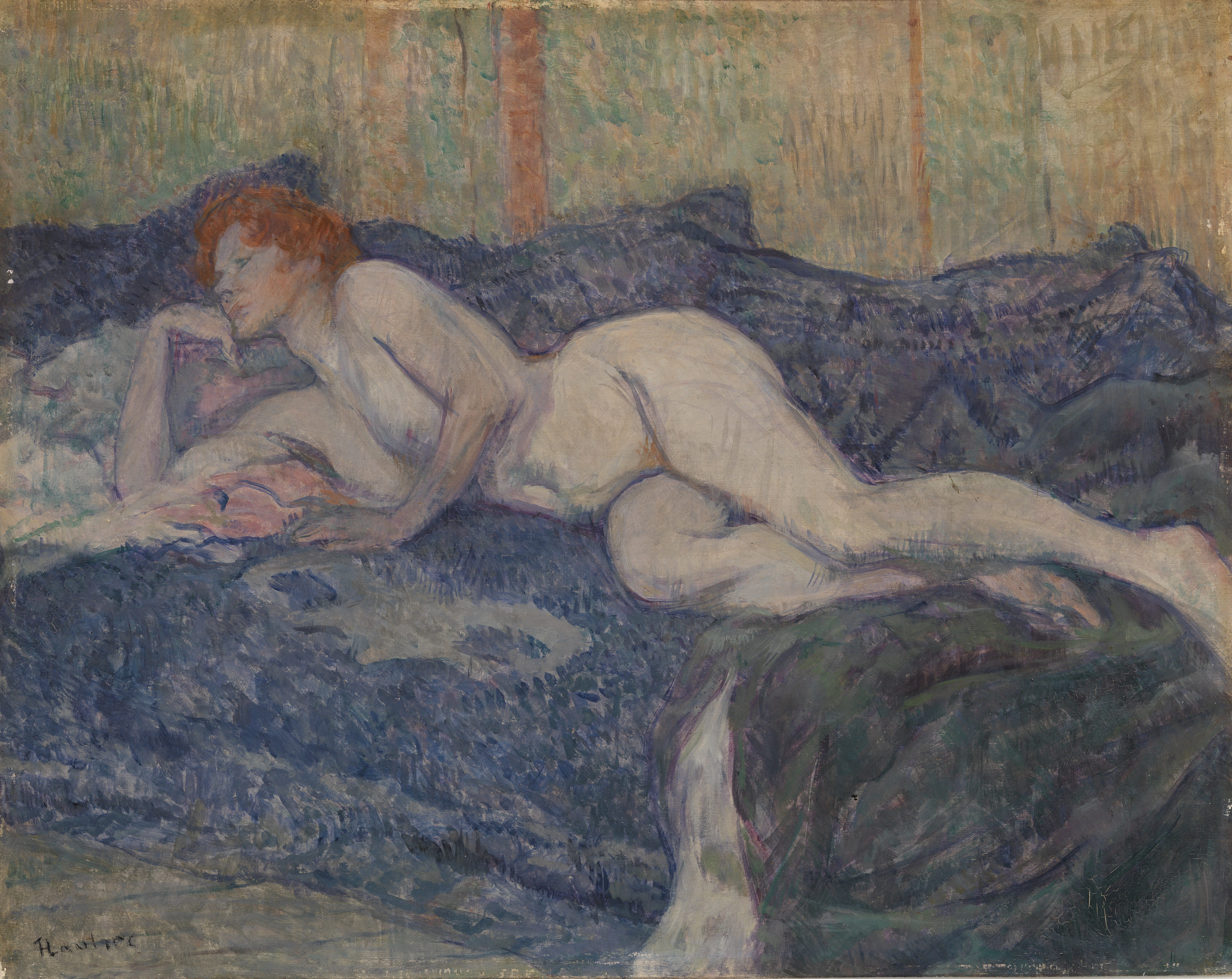
Nude Lying on a Couch (1897), by Henri de Toulouse-Lautrec, Barnes Foundation, Philadelphia.

Subsequently, the so-called post-impressionists were a group of artists who, building on the new technical discoveries made by the impressionists, reinterpreted them in their own ways, opening new avenues of development of great importance for the evolution of art in the twentieth century. Thus, more than a certain style, post-impressionism was a way of grouping diverse artists of different signs. Paul Cézanne structured the composition in geometric forms (cylinder, cone, and sphere), in an analytical synthesis of reality, a precursor of cubism. He treated the nude as a landscape or still life, as an expression of the relationship between volumes of color immersed in light, as in his Bathers (1879–1882) of the Petit-Palais in Paris. Paul Gauguin experimented with depth, giving new value to the pictorial plane through flat colors of symbolic character. After some beginnings in pointillism (Study of a Nude, 1880) and a stay in Pont-Aven with the Nabis (The Yellow Christ, 1889), his stay in Tahiti helped him to recreate a world of primitive placidity where nudity was contemplated naturally, as can be seen in I Raro te Oviri (1891), Loss of Innocence (1891), Tahitian Eve (1892), Two Tahitian Women on the Beach (1892), Woman at Sea (1892), Manao tupapau (1892), The Moon and the Earth (1893), Otahí or Solitude (1893), Delicious Day (1896), The Mango Woman (1896), Where Do We Come From? What Are We? Where Are We Going? (1897), Vairumati (1897), Nevermore (1897), And the gold of their bodies (1901), etc. Henri de Toulouse-Lautrec, in contrast to the stylized nudes of the academic salons, studied the female figure in its most crude carnality, without ignoring the body's own imperfections, with a preference for circus and music hall scenes, or bohemian and brothel environments: Fat Marie (1884), Woman Pulling Up Her Stockings (1894), The Medical Inspection (1894), The Two Friends (1894–1895), La Toilette (1896), Woman Lifting Her Shirt (1901), etc. Vincent van Gogh was the author of works of strong drama and interior exploration, with sinuous, dense brushstrokes, intense color, and a distortion of reality that gave him a dreamlike air. He painted a few nudes, most of them in Paris in 1887: Female nude lying down, Female nude on a bed, Female nude seen from the back.

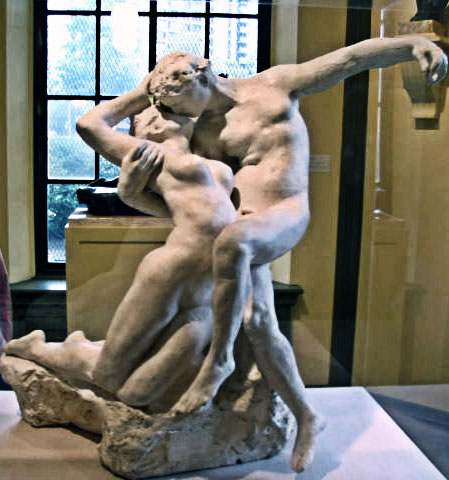
Eternal Springtime (1886–1890), one of the scenes from The Kiss, by Auguste Rodin, Musée Rodin, Paris.

In the field of sculpture, Auguste Rodin was a great innovator, not only in the physical plane but also in thematic innovation, more focused on the ordinary human being of his time and his environment, far from mythology and religion. He had a profound knowledge of the human body, which he treated with intimate care, with a strong component of psychological introspection. Michelangelo and Delacroix influenced him, but in essence, his work was innovative, introducing new typologies of the nude. For this, he used models who he let roam freely in his studio, adopting all kinds of forms, which Rodin captured with a mastery that immortalized the spontaneity of any moment and any posture. His figures tend toward dramatism, tragic tension, and the expression of the artist's concept of man's struggle against destiny. Thus, for more than thirty years he was working on figures for an unfinished project, The Gates of Hell (1880–1917) for the Museé des Arts Décoratifs in Paris—now in the Rodin Museum—from which project several works were detached that remained as independent figures, such as The Thinker (1880–1900), for which he was inspired by Carpeaux's Ugolino, or The Kiss (1886–1890), which represents the love of Paolo and Francesca narrated in The Divine Comedy. Other works of his were The Age of Bronze (1877), Saint John the Baptist (1878), Eve (1881), The Winter (or La Belle Heaulmière, 1884–1885), The Martyr (1885), The Torso (1889), The Muse (1896), The Three Shades (1899), Danaid (1901), etc. Following in Rodin's wake were sculptors such as Antoine Bourdelle (Hercules the Archer, 1909), Camille Claudel (The Implorer, 1894–1905; The Age of Maturity, 1899–1913), Joseph Bernard (The Young Woman with the Cauldron, 1910) and Charles Despiau (Eve, 1925).

The Swede Anders Zorn made unabashedly voluptuous and healthy nudes, usually in landscapes, with vibrant light effects on the skin, in bright brushstrokes of great color, as in In the Open Air (1888), The Bathers (1888), Women Bathing in the Sauna (1906), Girl Sunbathing (1913), Helga (1917), Studio Idyll (1918).

In Spain, the work of Joaquín Sorolla stood out, who interpreted impressionism in a personal way, with a loose technique and vigorous brushstroke, with a bright and sensitive coloring, where light is especially important, the luminous atmosphere that surrounds his scenes of Mediterranean themes, on beaches and seascapes where children play, society ladies stroll or fishermen are engaged in their tasks. His work includes some nudes, such as Sad Inheritance (1899), Desnudo de mujer (1902), The Horse's Bath (1909), Children on the beach (1910), After the Bath (1911), etc. His disciples were: his son-in-law Francisco Pons Arnau (Composición), Ignacio Pinazo (Desnudo de frente, 1872–1879), Rigoberto Soler (Nineta, Después del baño) and Julio Moisés (Eva, Pili).

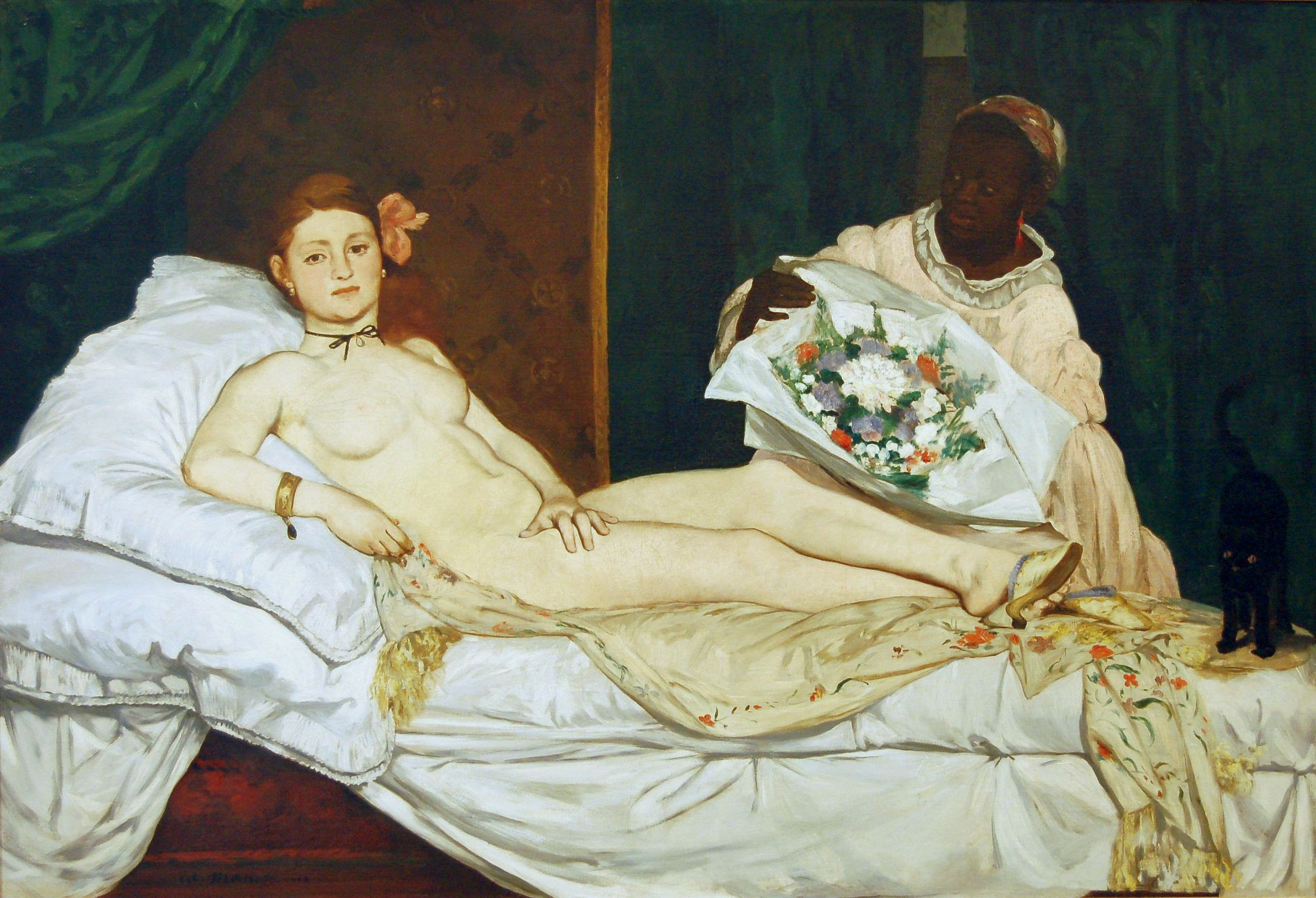
Olympia (1865), by Édouard Manet, Musée d'Orsay, Paris.

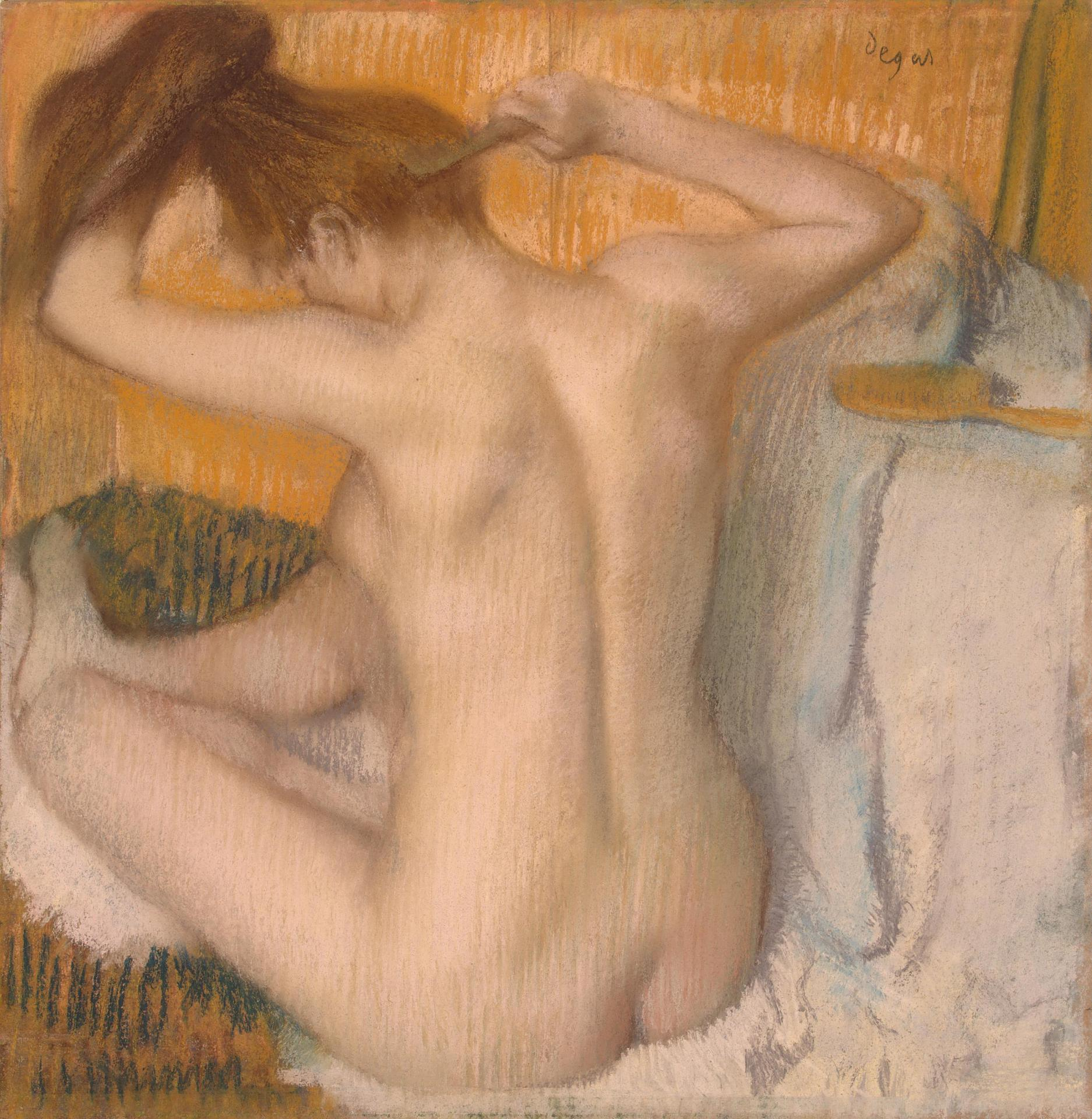
Girl in the Bath (1885), by Edgar Degas, Pushkin Museum, Moscow.

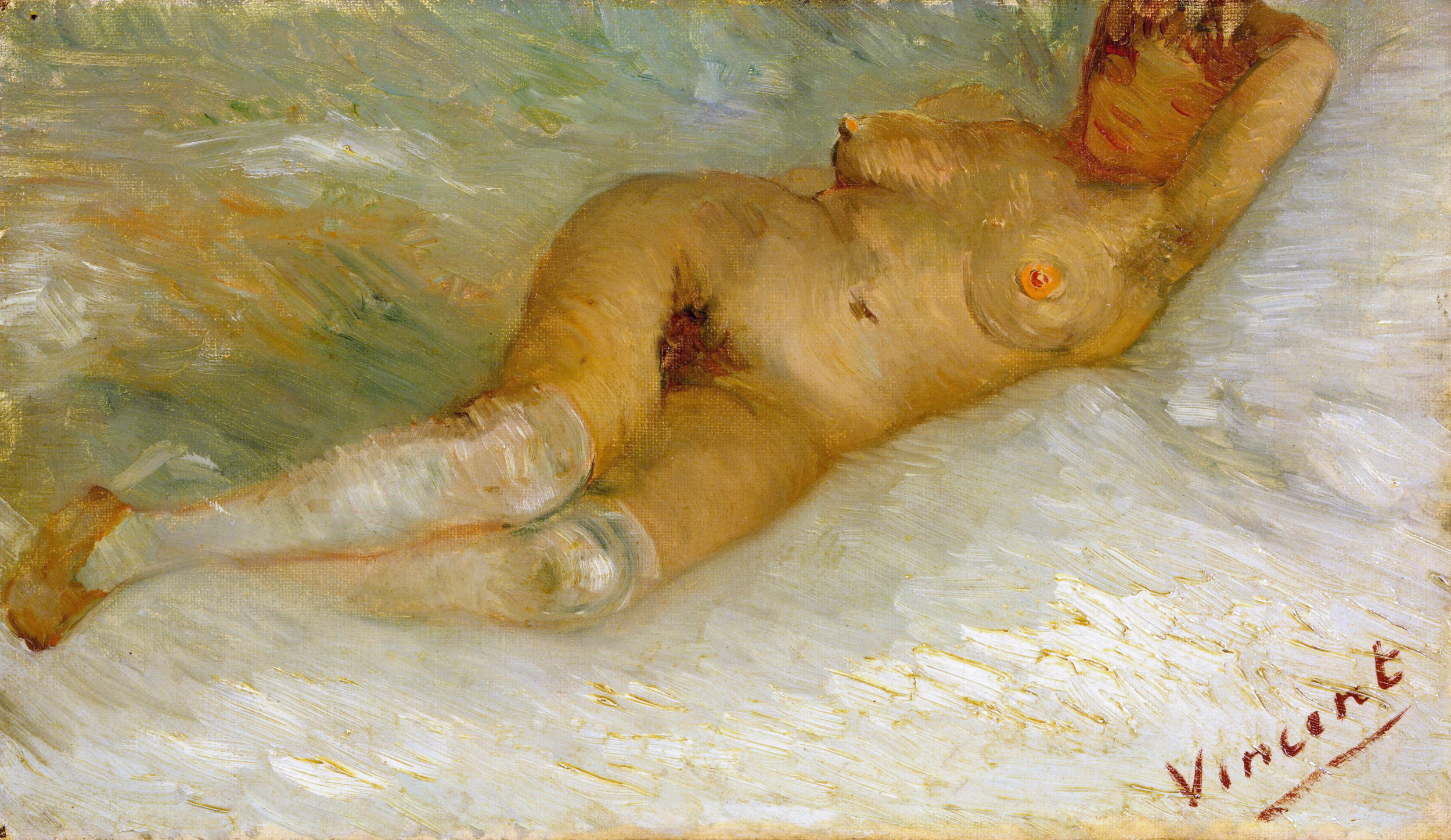
Female nude lying down (1887), by Vincent van Gogh, Collection S. Van Deventer, De Steeg.

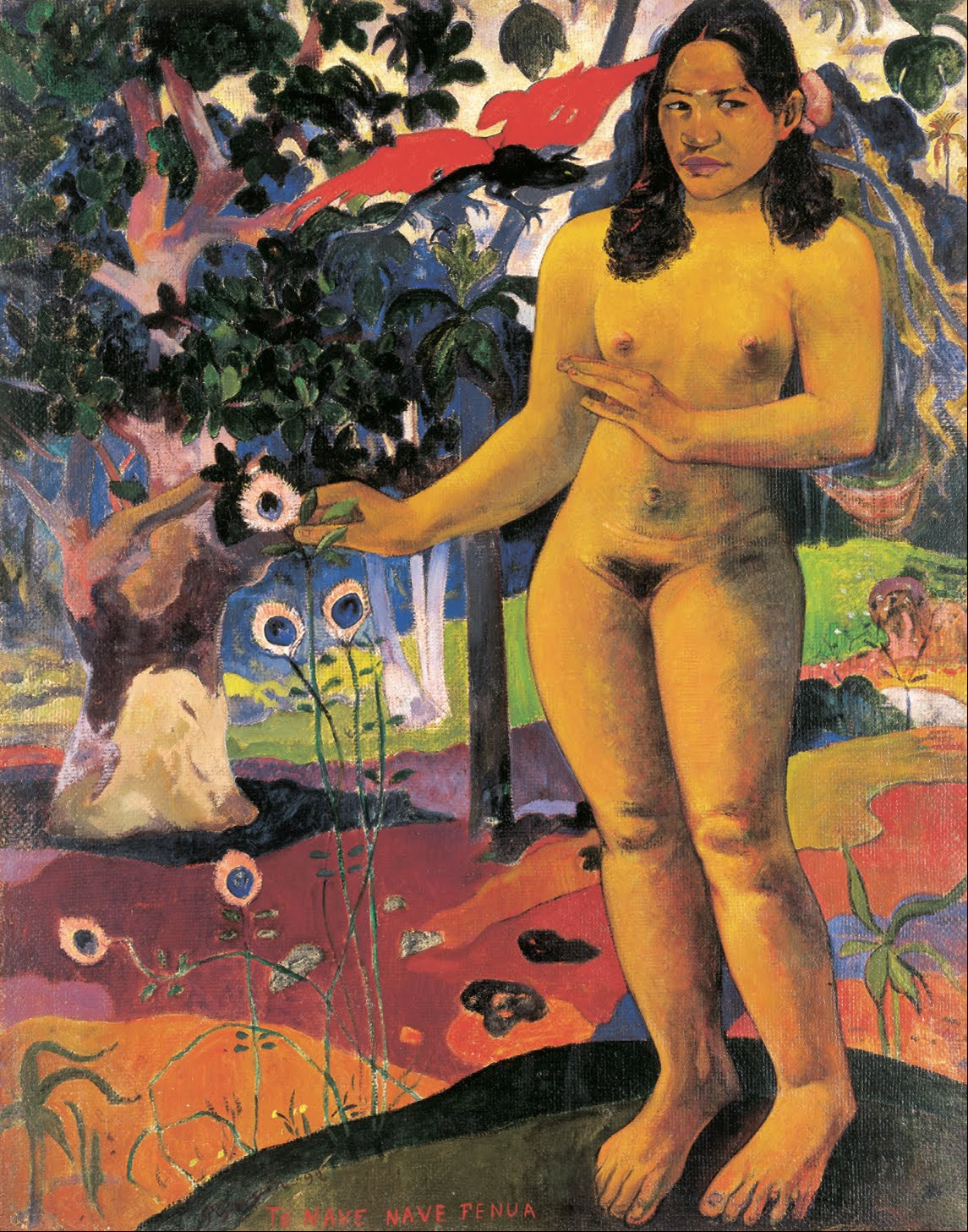
Delightful Land (Te navenave fenua) (1892), by Paul Gauguin, Ohara Museum of Art, Kurashiki (Okayama).

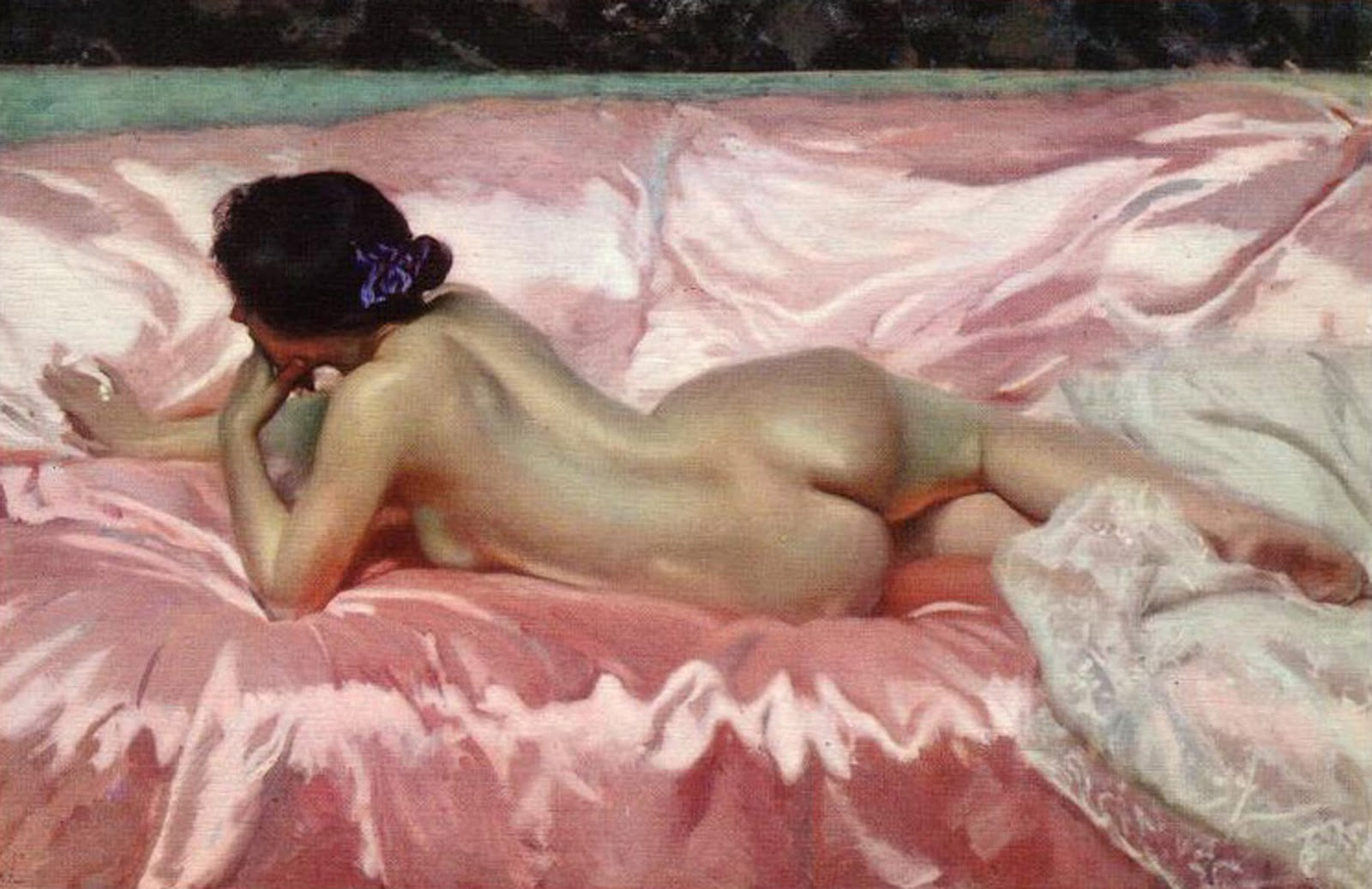
Desnudo de mujer (1902), by Joaquín Sorolla, Museo Sorolla, Madrid.

==== Symbolism ====
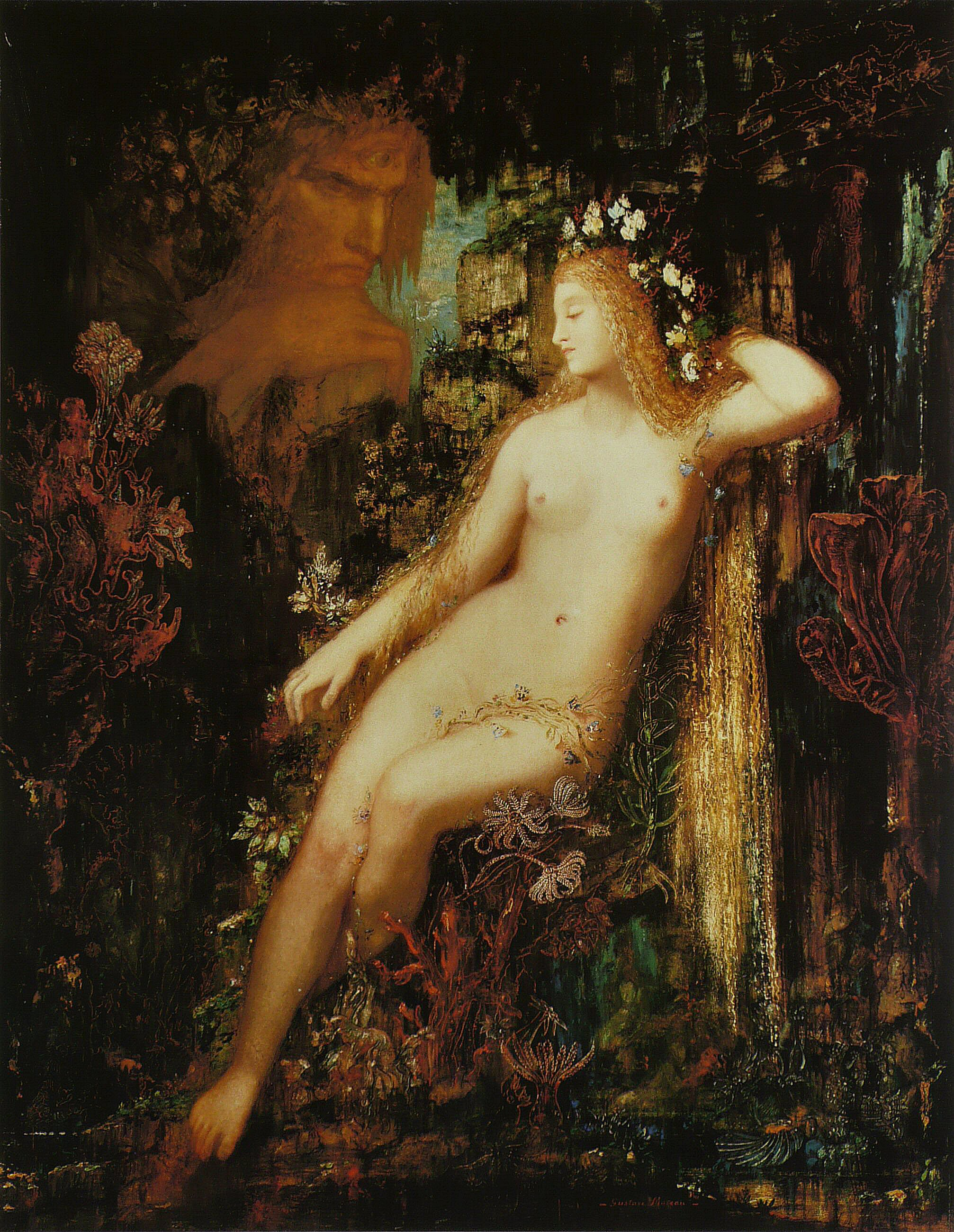
Galatea (1880), by Gustave Moreau, Musée d'Orsay, Paris.

Symbolism was a fantastic and dreamlike style, which emerged as a reaction to the naturalism of the realist and impressionist currents, placing special emphasis on the world of dreams, as well as on satanic and terrifying aspects, sex, and perversion. A main characteristic of symbolism was aestheticism, a reaction to the prevailing utilitarianism of the time and to the ugliness and materialism of the industrial era. Against this, a tendency arose that granted art and beauty an autonomy of their own, synthesized in Théophile Gautier's formula l'art pour l'art ("art for art's sake"), even going so far as to speak of "aesthetic religion". This position sought to isolate the artist from society, autonomously seeking his own inspiration and letting himself be driven solely by an individual search for beauty.

One of the characteristics of symbolism is the dark attraction to the perverse woman, the femme fatale, the Eve turned into Lilith, the enigmatic and distant, disturbing woman, the woman that Manuel Machado defined as "brittle, vicious and mystical, pre-Raphaelite virgin and Parisian cat". She is a woman loved and hated, adored and vilified, exalted and repudiated, virtuous and sinful, who will adopt numerous symbolic and allegorical forms, such as sphinx, mermaid, chimera, medusa, winged genie, etc. An artificial and androgynous, ambiguous type of beauty became fashionable, a type of leonardesque beauty, with undefined features, which will have a symbolic equivalent in flowers such as the lily or animals such as the swan and the peacock.

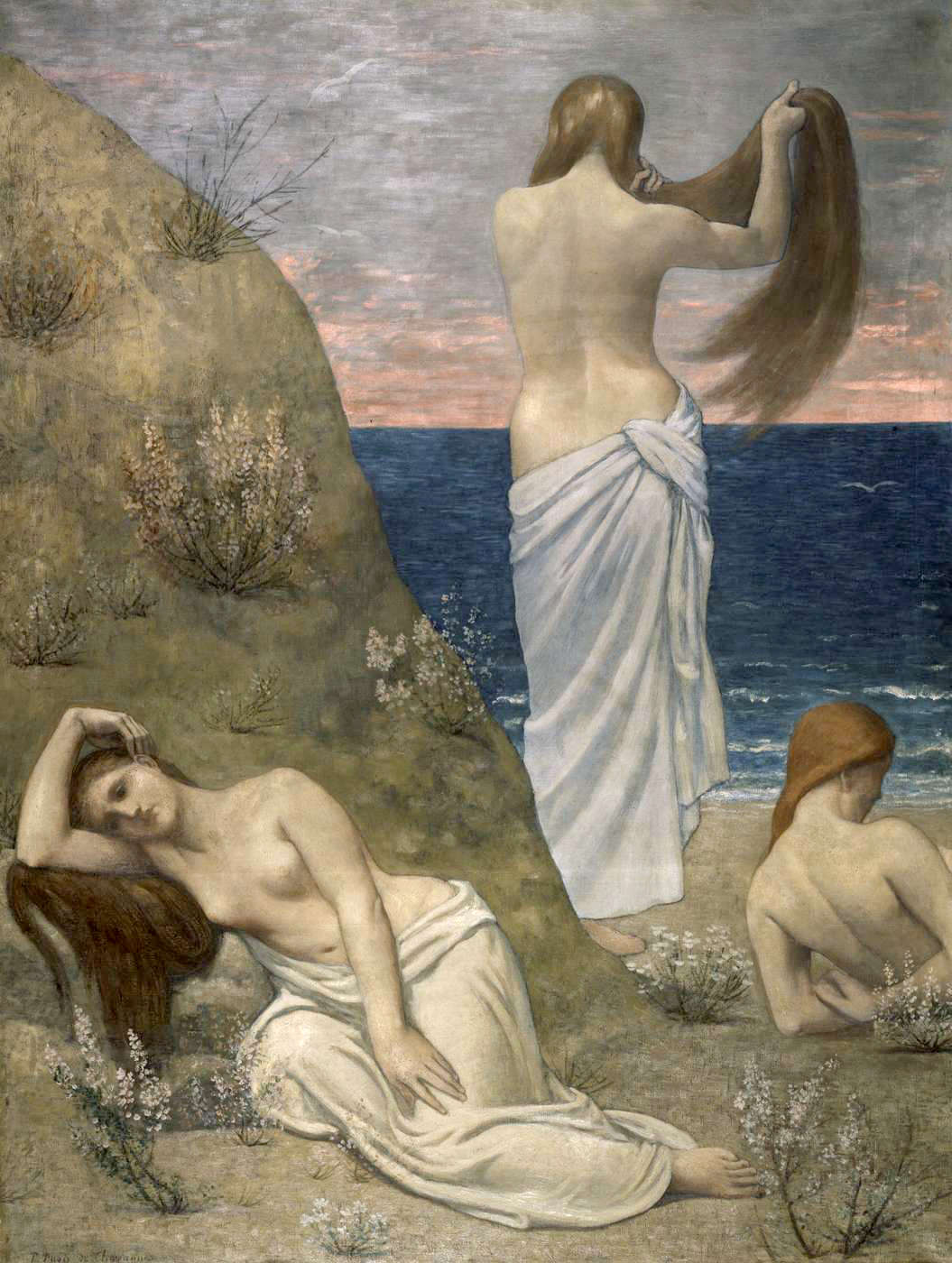
Young Girls by the Seashore (1879), by Pierre Puvis de Chavannes, Musée d'Orsay, Paris.

Symbolism developed especially in France, being one of its initiators, Gustave Moreau, an artist heir to romanticism, while he felt a great devotion to the masters of the Italian Quattrocento. His works are of a fantastic and ornamental style, with variegated compositions densely populated with all kinds of objects and plant elements, with a suggestive eroticism that reflects his fears and obsessions, with a prototype of an ambiguous woman, between innocence and perversity: Oedipus and the Sphinx (1864), Orpheus (1865), Jason and Medea (1865), Leda (1865–1875), The Chimera (1867), Prometheus (1868), The Rape of Europa (1869), The Sirens (1872), The Apparition (1874–1876), Salome (1876), Hercules and the Hydra of Lerna (1876), Galatea (1880), Jupiter and Semele (1894–1896).

Following in his footsteps were artists such as Pierre Puvis de Chavannes, who created large mural decorations in which he returned to linearity after the Impressionist experiments, with melancholic landscapes where the nude figure abounds, as in The Work (1863), Autumn (1865), Hope (1872), Young Girls by the Seashore (1879), The Sacred Grove, Beloved of the Arts and Muses (1884–1889), etc. Odilon Redon developed a work of strong oneiric content, finding in dreams an inexhaustible source of inspiration, with a style based on a soft drawing and a coloring of phosphorescent aspect (The Cyclops, 1898–1900). Aristide Maillol began in painting, with great interest in the female figure in nature (Mediterranean, 1898; The Wave, 1898; Two Nudes in a Landscape, 1900), to move later to sculpture, where he found his most suitable means of expression: The Night (1902–1909), Mediterranean (1902–1923), Chained Action (1906), Young Cyclist (1908), Bathing Girl Drying (1921), Venus with a Necklace (1930), The Three Nymphs (1930–1937), The Mountain (1937), The River (1938–1943), The Air (1939).

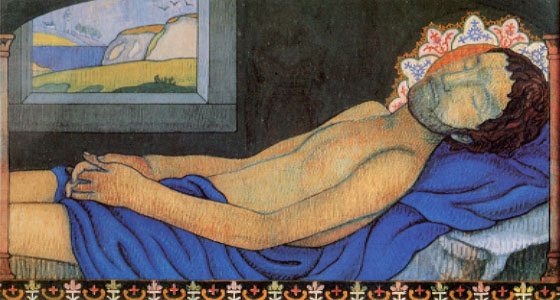
The Recumbent Christ (1895), by Charles Filiger.

A group of artists known as Nabis, influenced by Gauguin and concerned with the expressive use of color, met in Pont-Aven. Among its members were: Félix Vallotton, who developed an ironic style with connotations of black humor, with an unabashed eroticism, where the bodies have a flat, Japanese-influenced constitution, with faces that look like masks (Bathing on a Summer Afternoon, 1892); Pierre Bonnard, who painted nudes under different types of light, both natural and artificial, generally in intimate scenes, bedroom and boudoir, with a taste for reflections in mirrors, often based on photographs (Woman reclining on a bed, 1899; The nap, 1900; Man and Woman, 1900; Nude Against the Light, 1907; Mirror Effect, 1909; Dressing Table with Mirror, 1913; Nude in the Bucket, 1916); and Charles Filiger, who developed a medieval-inspired style—especially from Gothic stained glass—of flat colors with black outlines, as in The Recumbent Christ (1895), inspired by Holbein's The Corpse of Christ in the Tomb, reduced to simple and pure forms, showing a symbolic candor that turns Christ into a transcendental, evocative figure, of a naivety that suggests purity.

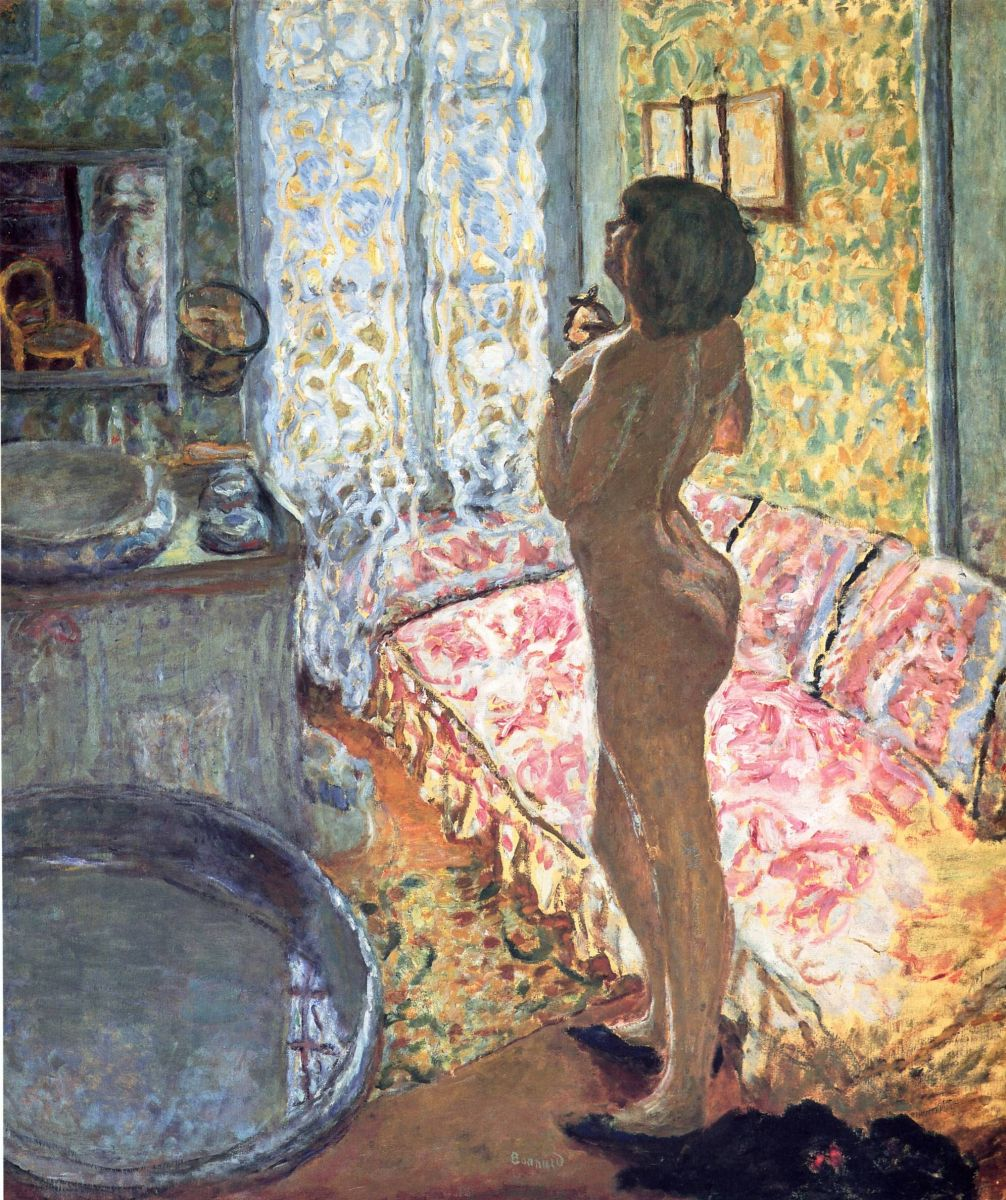
Nude Against the Light (c. 1923), by Pierre Bonnard.

In Belgium, Félicien Rops was also inspired by the world of the fantastic and the supernatural, with an inclination towards the satanic and references to death, with an eroticism that reflects the dark and perverted aspect of love: The Cold Devils (1860), The Temptations of St. Anthony (1878), Pornokrates (1878), The Sacrifice (1882). Jean Delville was interested in occultism, showing in his work secret obsessions, where his figures are a mixture of flesh and spirit: The idol of perversity (1891), The treasures of Satan (1895), The school of Plato (1898), The love of souls (1900). In sculpture, George Minne was the author of the Fountain with Kneeling Youths (1898–1906), where the same figure of a naked young man is repeated five times around a pond, like Narcissus contemplating his image reflected in the water, leading the gaze into the inner space in search of the solution to the anguish they reflect.

In the Netherlands, Jan Toorop stood out as the author of The Three Brides (1893), which shows the influence of the Chinese shadow figures of Java—where he was born—with figures with long arms and delicate silhouettes. Piet Mondrian, before reaching the neoplasticist abstraction, made some symbolist works, generated by his interest in esotericism: Evolution (1910–1911) is a triptych showing three naked figures completely spiritualized, symbolizing the access to knowledge and mystical light.

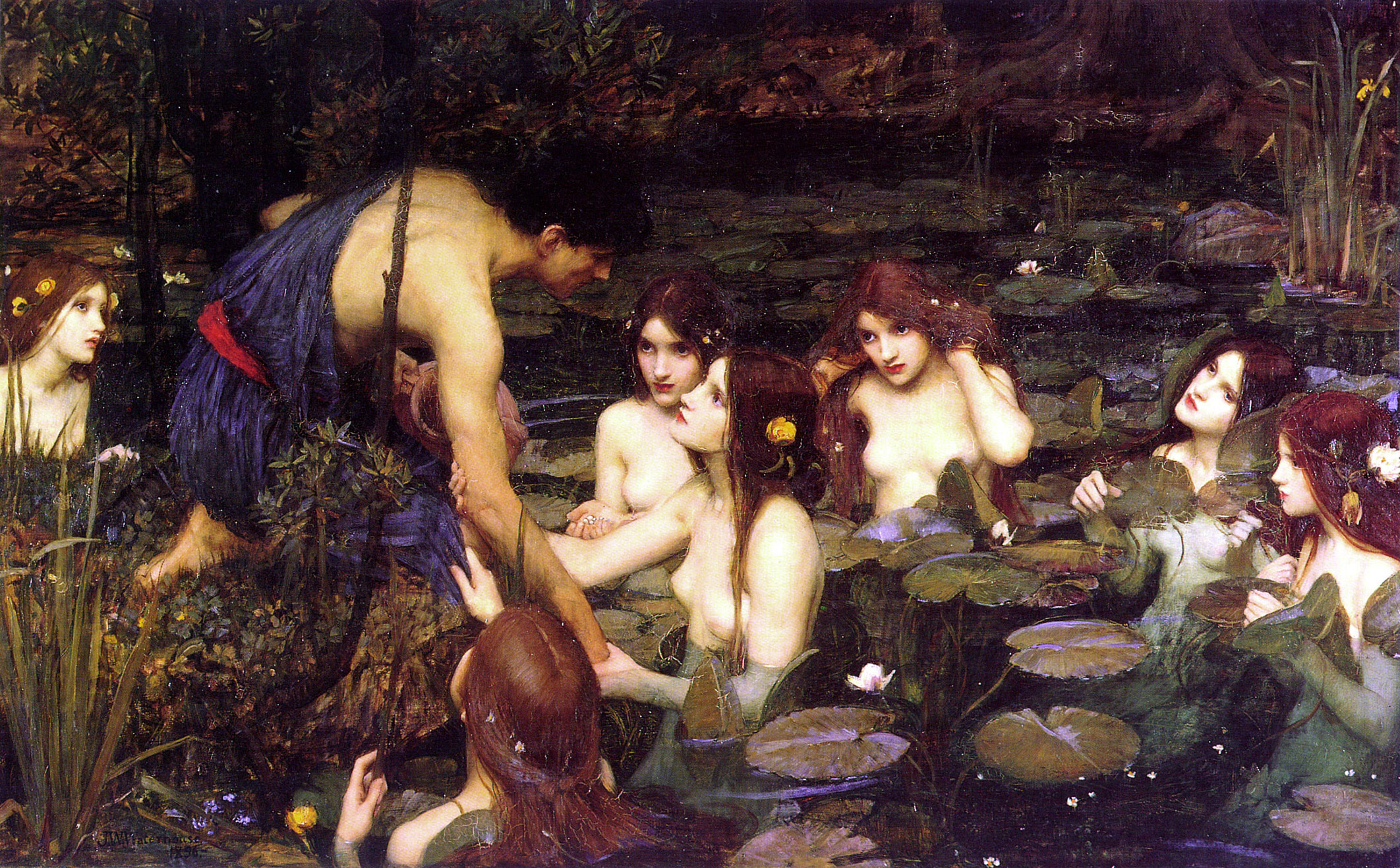
Hylas and the Nymphs (1896), by John William Waterhouse, City Art Galleries, Manchester.

In Great Britain, the school of the Pre-Raphaelites emerged, who were inspired—as their name indicates—by Italian painters before Raphael, as well as by the recently emerged photography. Although their subject matter was of lyrical and religious preferences, they also tackled the nude, such as Dante Gabriel Rossetti (Venus Verticordia, 1868), Edward Burne-Jones (the Pygmalion series, 1868–1870; The Garden of Pan, 1876; The Wheel of Fortune, 1883; The Three Graces, 1890), John Everett Millais (The Knight Errant, 1870), John William Waterhouse (Hylas and the Nymphs, 1896), etc. Between Pre-Raphaelite symbolism and modernist decorativism was the work of the illustrator Aubrey Beardsley, who produced numerous works of an erotic nature (such as his illustrations for Lysistrata and Oscar Wilde's Salome), with a great satirical and irreverent sense, with a style based on a highly stylized line and large black and white surfaces.

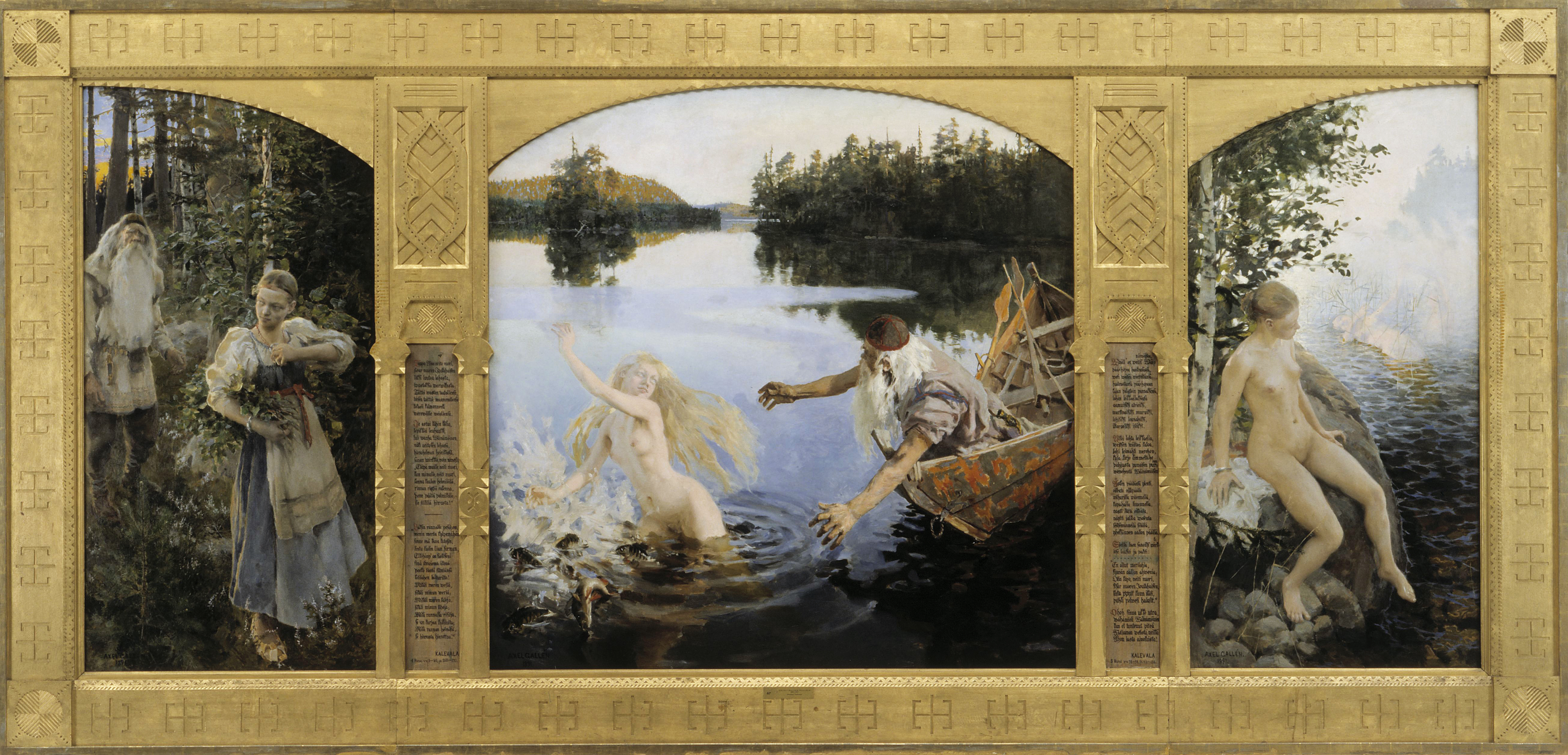
The Myth of Aino (1891), by Akseli Gallen-Kallela, Ateneum, Helsinki.

The German Franz von Stuck developed a decorative style close to modernism, although its subject matter is more symbolist, with an eroticism of torrid sensuality that reflects a concept of woman as the personification of perversity: Sin (1893), The Kiss of the Sphinx (1895), Air, Water, Fire (1913). In Austria, Gustav Klimt recreated a fantasy world with a strong erotic component, with a classicist composition of ornamental style, where sex and death are intertwined, dealing without taboos with sexuality in aspects such as pregnancy, lesbianism, or masturbation. In Nuda Veritas (1899), he moved away from the iconographic symbolism of the female nude, becoming a self-referential symbol; the woman is no longer an allegory but an image of herself and her sexuality. Other works of his are: Agitated Water (1898), Judith I (1901), the Beethoven Frieze (1902), Hope I (1903), The Three Ages of Woman (1905), Danae (1907), Judith II (Salome) (1909), The Girlfriends (1917), Adam and Eve (1917–1918), etc. Alfred Kubin was above all a draftsman, expressing in his drawings a terrifying world of loneliness and despair, populated by monsters, skeletons, insects and hideous animals, with explicit references to sex, where the female presence plays an evil and disturbing role, as evidenced in works such as Lubricity (1901–1902), where a priapic dog harasses a young woman huddled in a corner; or Somersault (1901–1902), where a small homunculus jumps as if in a swimming pool over a huge female vulva.

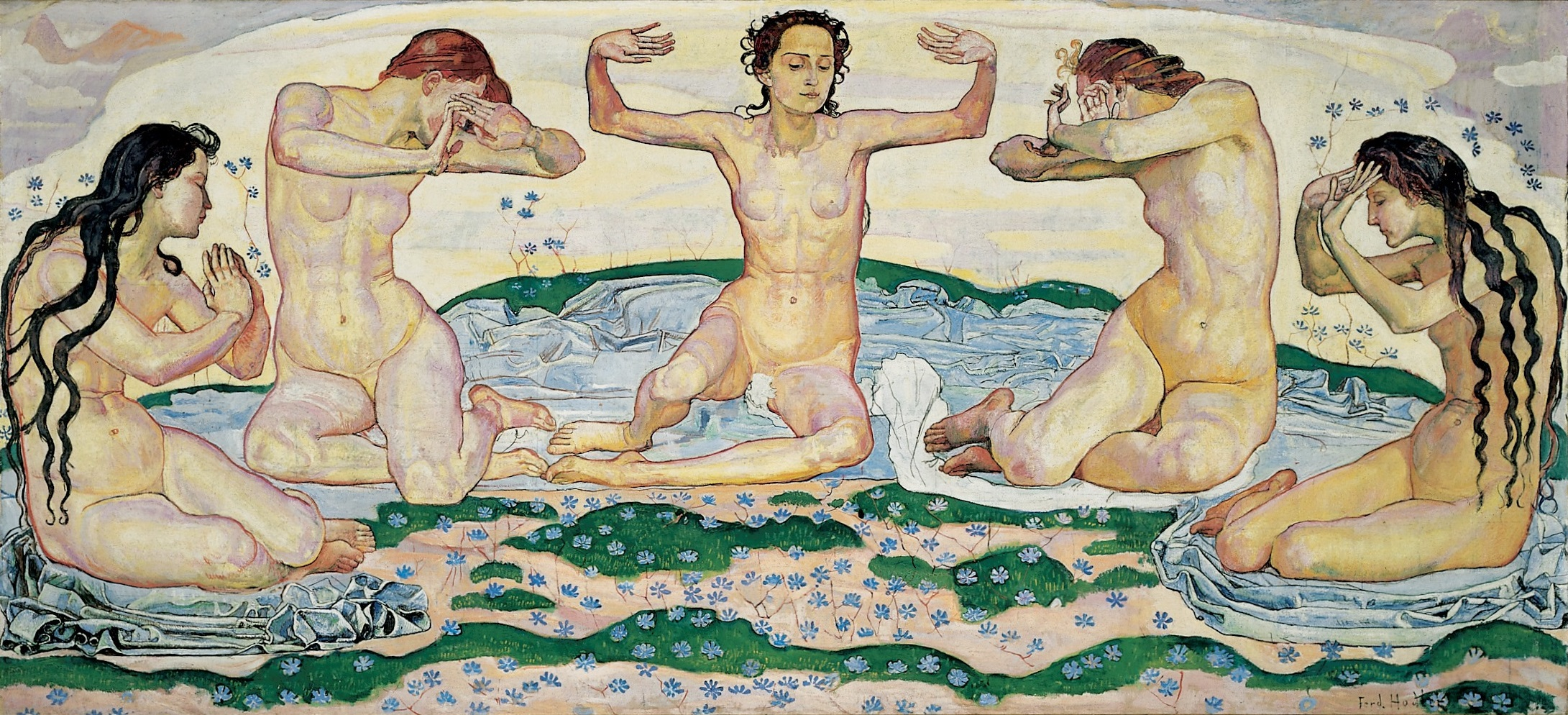
Day (1900), by Ferdinand Hodler, Kunstmuseum, Bern.

In Switzerland, Ferdinand Hodler was influenced by Dürer, Holbein and Raphael, with a style based on parallelism, repeating lines, colors and volumes: Night (1890), Rise in Space (1892), Day (1900), Sensation (1901–1902), Young Man Admired by Women (1903), Truth (1903). Arnold Böcklin was heir to Friedrich's romanticism, with an allegorical style based on legends and imaginary characters, set in a fantastic, obsessive atmosphere, as in Venus Genitrix (1895). The Czech František Kupka was also interested in occultism, going through a symbolist phase before reaching abstraction: Money (1899), Ballad of Epona (The Joys) (1900), The Wave (1902). In Russia, Kazimir Malevich, future founder of suprematism, had in its beginnings a symbolist phase, characterized by eroticism combined with a certain esoteric mysticism, with a style tending to monochrome, with a predominance of red and yellow: Woman picking flowers (1908), Oak and Dryads (1908).

Linked to symbolism was also the so-called naïf art, whose authors were self-taught, with a somewhat naive and unstructured composition, instinctive, with a certain primitivism, although fully conscious and expressive. Its greatest exponent was Henri Rousseau, who, starting from academicism, developed an innovative body of work, of great freshness and simplicity, with humorous and fantastic touches and a predilection for the exotic jungle landscape. He made some nudes, such as The Snake Charmer (1907), Eve (1907) and The Dream (1910).

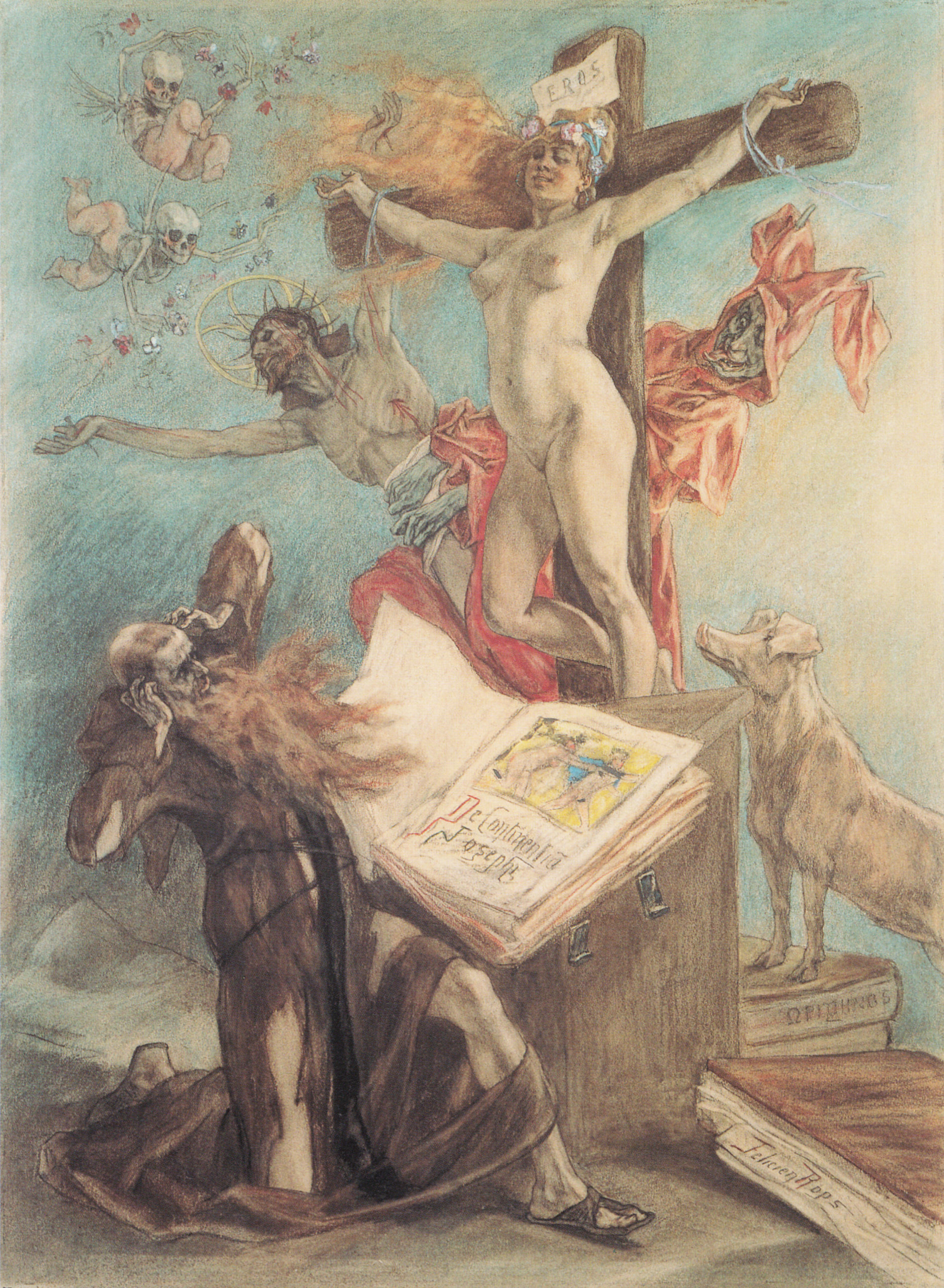
The Temptations of Saint Anthony (1878), by Félicien Rops, Cabinet des Estampes de la Bibliothèque Royale Albert Ier, Brussels.

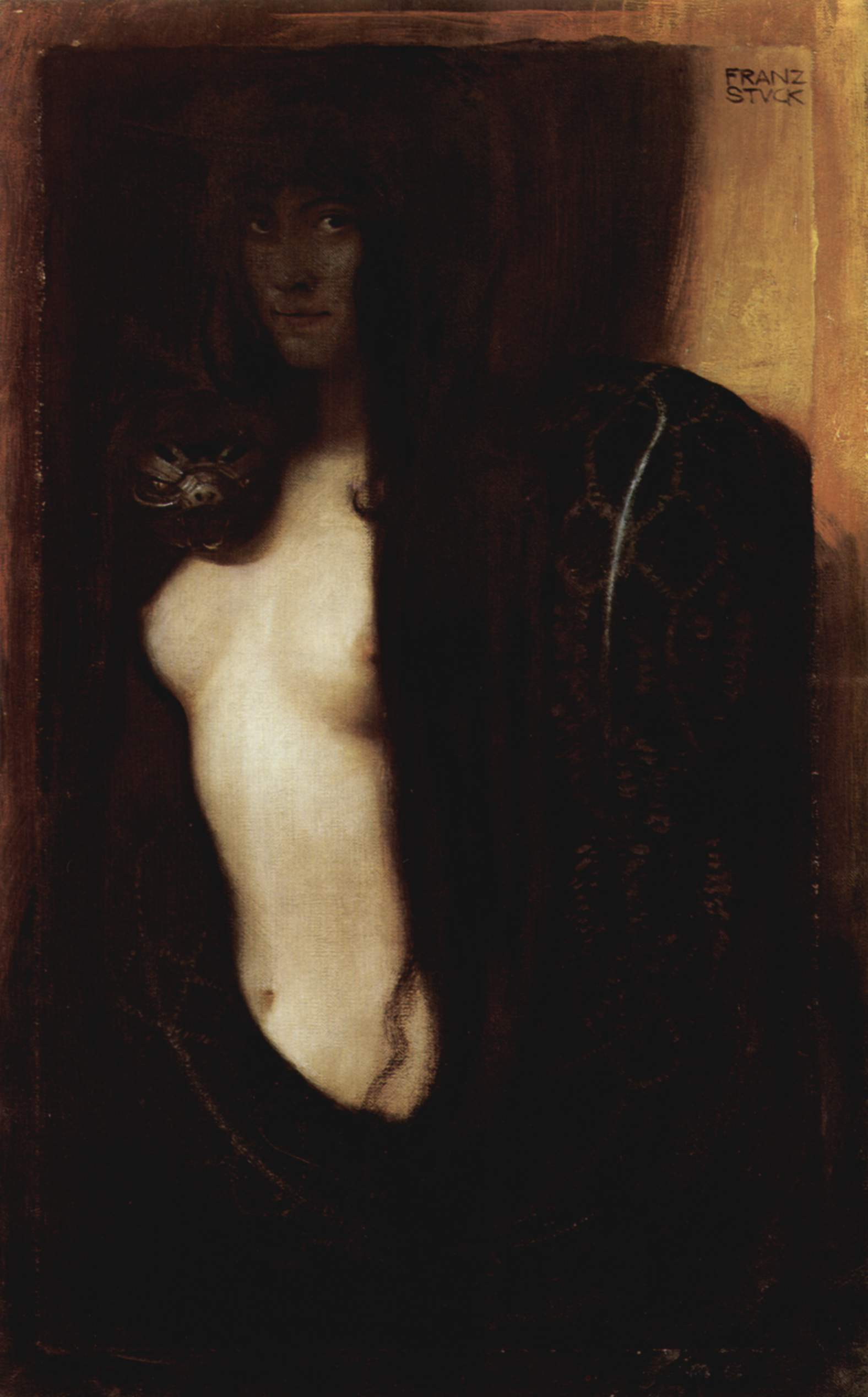
Sin (1893), by Franz von Stuck, Neue Pinakothek, Munich.

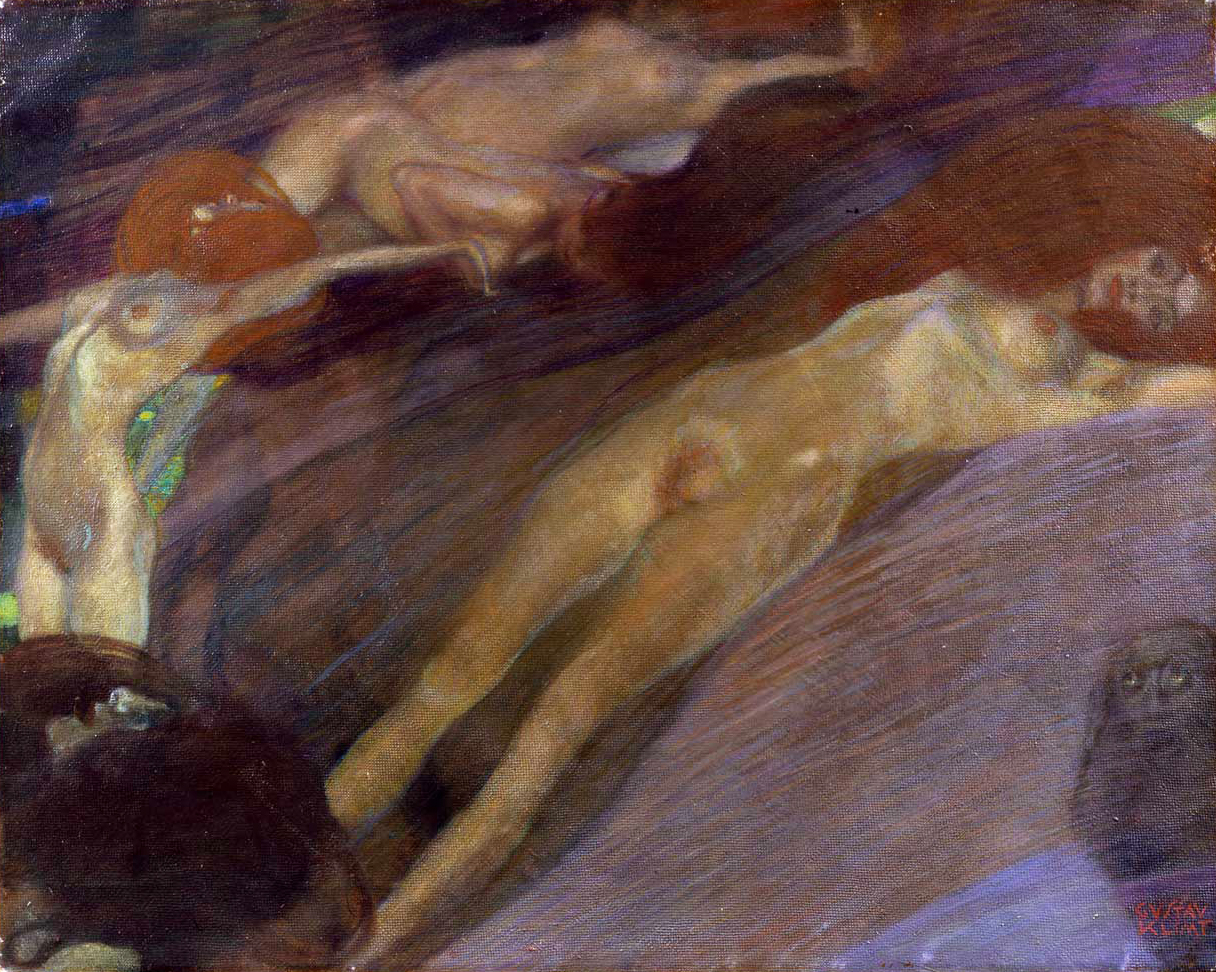
Agitated Water (1898), by Gustav Klimt, Private Collection, New York City.

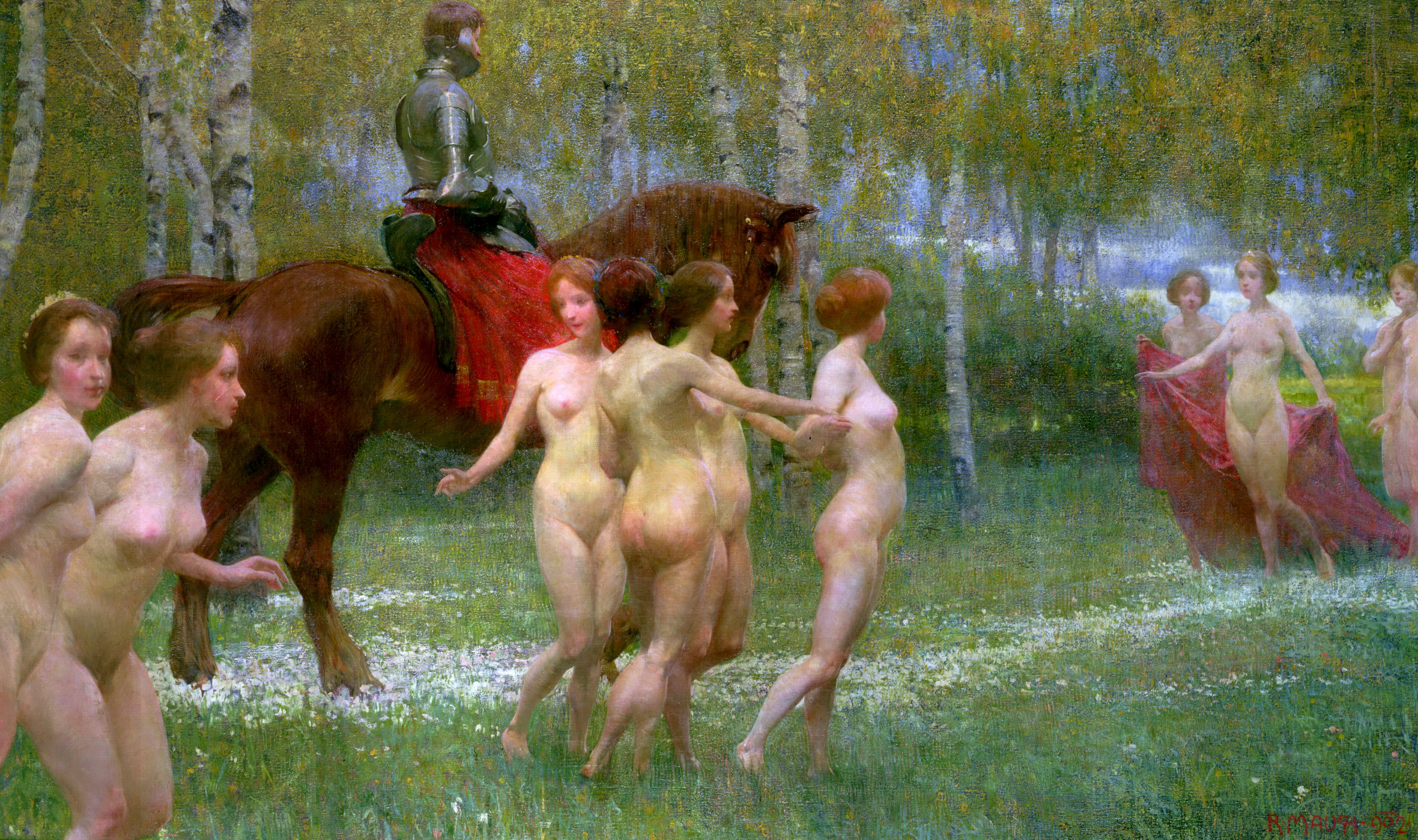
The Knight's Dream (1902), by Richard Mauch, private collection.

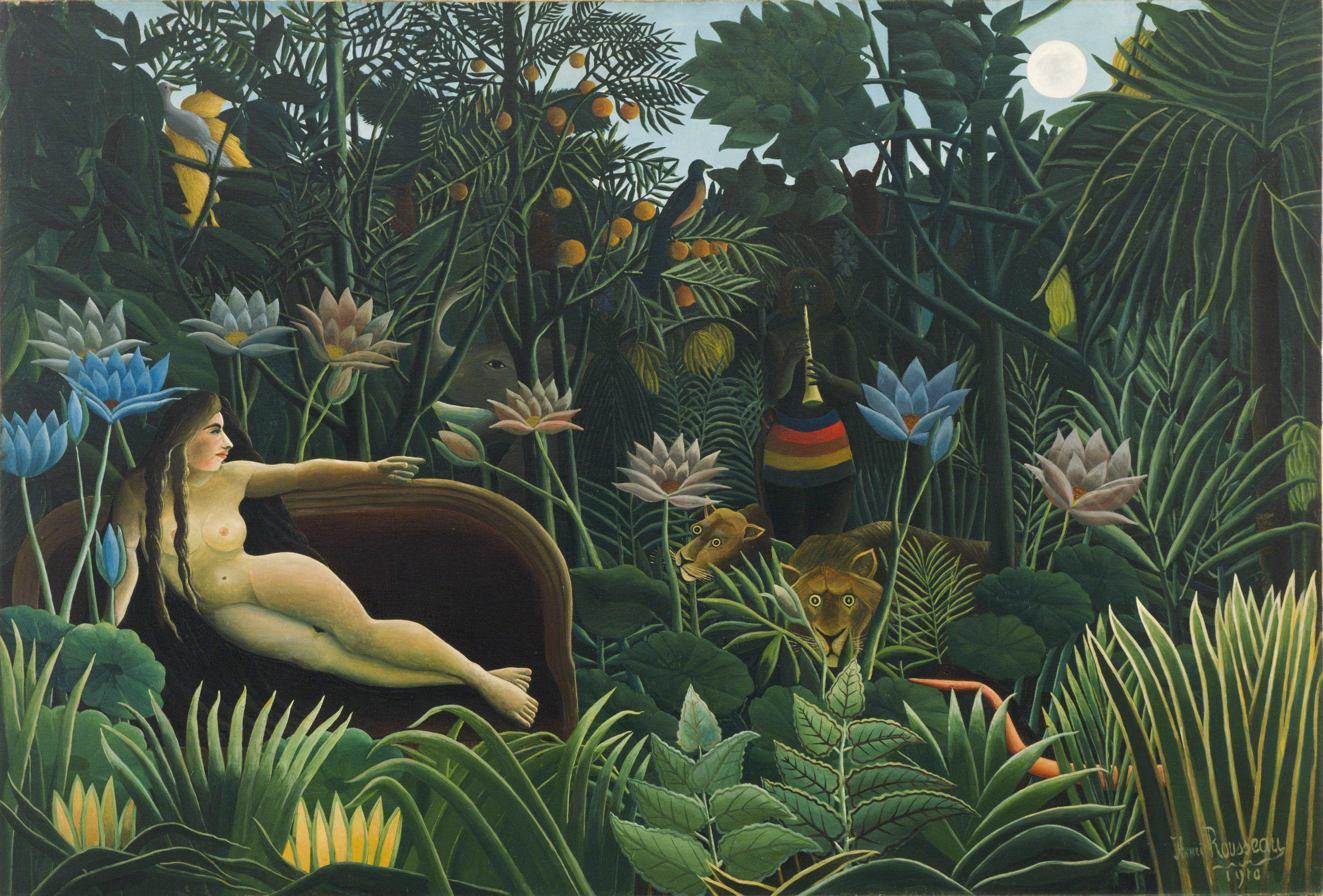
The Dream (1910), by Henri Rousseau, Museum of Modern Art, New York City.

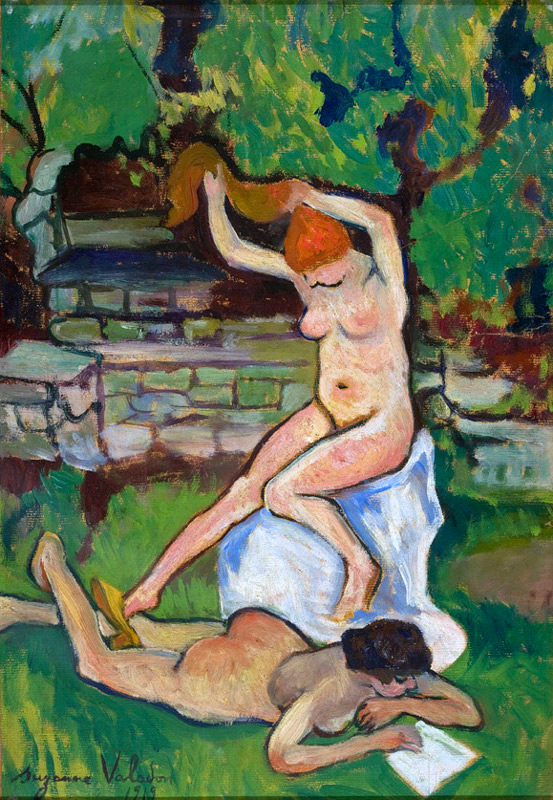
Nudes (1919), by Suzanne Valadon, São Paulo Museum of Art.

=== 20th century ===
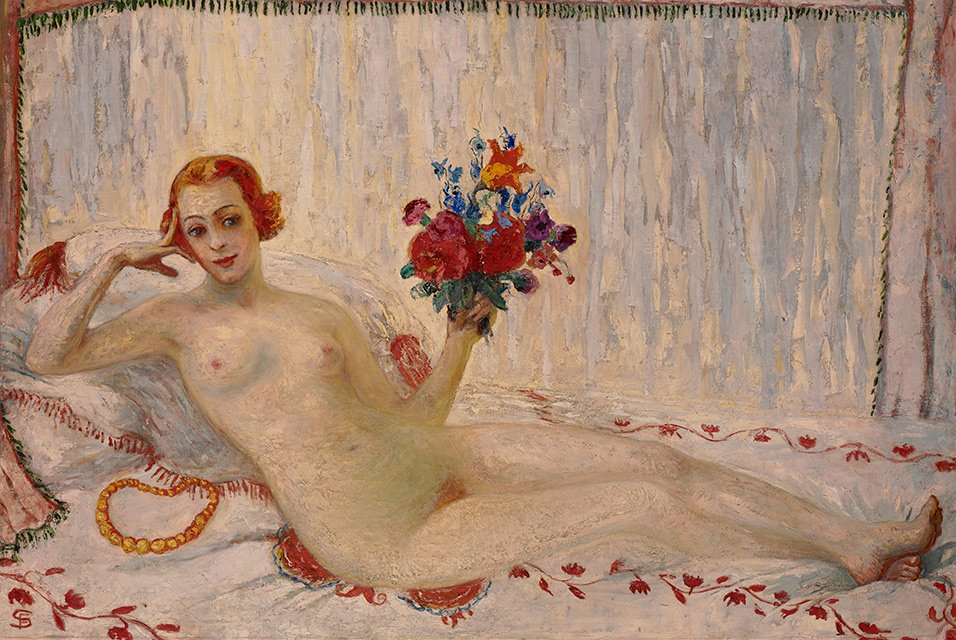
A Model (Nude Self-Portrait) (1915–1916), by Florine Stettheimer, Columbia University Library, New York City

The art of the 20th century underwent a profound transformation: in a more materialistic, more consumerist society, art addresses the senses rather than the intellect. Likewise, the concept of fashion has gained particular relevance, a product of the speed of communication and the consumerist aspect of today's civilization. Thus, the avant-garde movements arose, which sought to integrate art into society, aiming for a greater interrelationship between artist and spectator, since it is the latter who interprets the work and can discover meanings the artist did not even know. The latest artistic trends have even lost interest in the artistic object: traditional art was an art of the object, the current art of the concept. There is a revaluation of active art, of action, of spontaneous, ephemeral manifestations, of non-commercial art (conceptual art, happening, environment).

In the twentieth century, the nude has gained increasing prominence, especially thanks to the mass media, which have enabled its wider dissemination, particularly in film, photography, and comics, and, more recently, the Internet. It has also proliferated to a great extent in advertising, due to its increasing social acceptance and its great appeal to people. Nudity no longer has the negative connotation it had in previous times, mainly due to the increase of secularism among society, which perceives nudity as something more natural and not morally objectionable. In this sense, nudism and naturism have been gaining followers in recent years, and no one is scandalized to see another person naked on a beach. It is also worth noting the growing cult of the body, with practices such as bodybuilding, fitness, and aerobics, which allow the body to be shaped to standards considered aesthetically pleasing.

==== Vanguardism ====
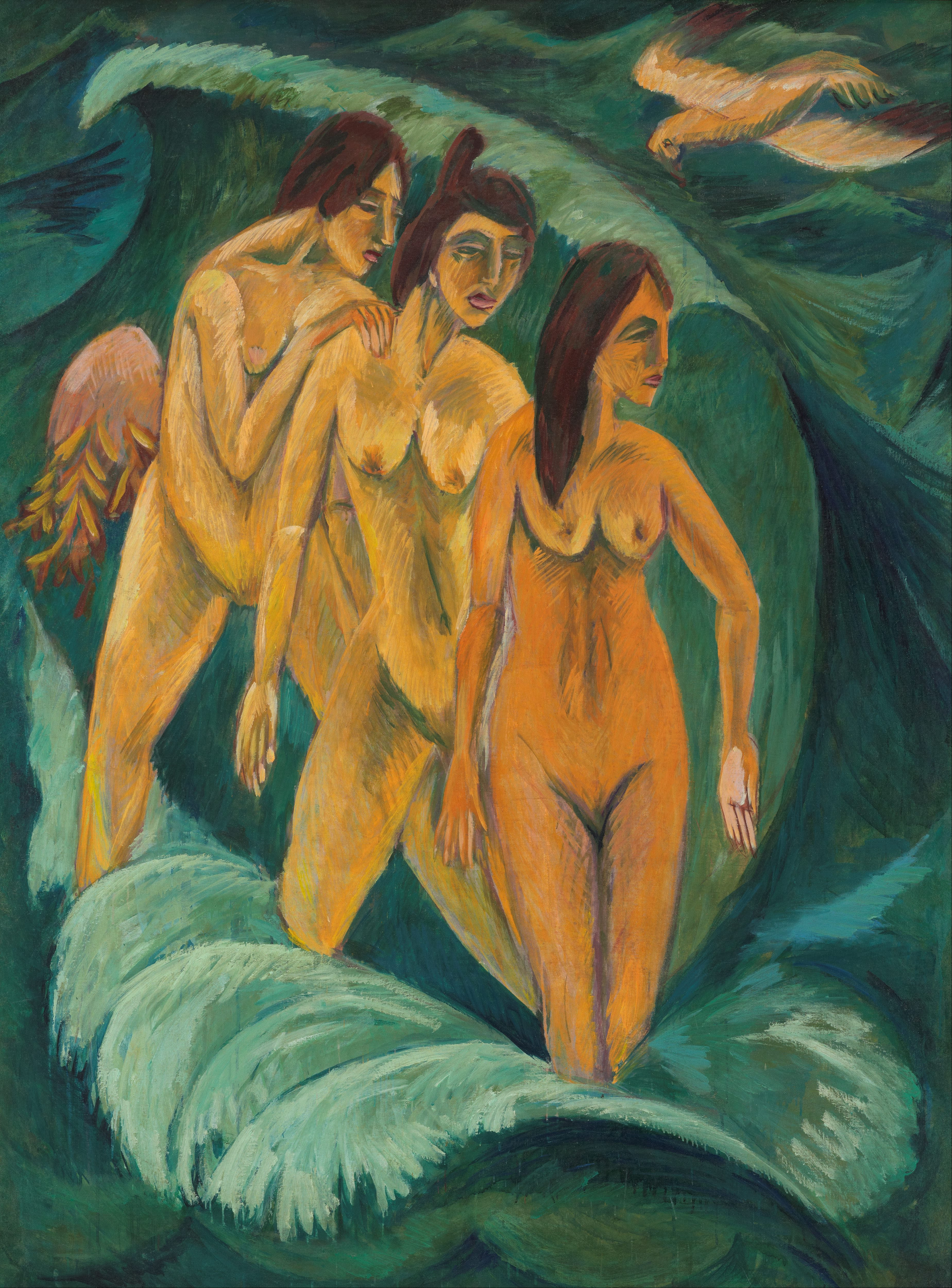
Three Bathers (1913), by Ernst Ludwig Kirchner, Art Gallery of New South Wales.

In the early years of the 20th century the foundations of the so-called avant-garde art were forged: the concept of reality was questioned by new scientific theories (Bergson's subjectivity of time, Einstein's relativity, quantum mechanics); Freud's theory of psychoanalysis also had an influence. On the other hand, new technologies changed art's function, since photography and cinema were already responsible for capturing reality. Thanks to the ethnographic collections promoted by European colonialism, artists had contact with the art of other civilizations (African, Asian, Oceanic), which brought a more subjective and emotional vision of art. All these factors brought about a change in sensibility that led the artist to search for new forms of expression.

Artistic avant-gardism aimed to breathe new life into art, to return to the natural roots of design and artistic composition, for which they rebelled against academic art, which they saw as subject to rules that seemed to these new artists to nullify creativity and artistic inspiration. Two of the first works that represented a revolution in art at the beginning of the century were nudes: Matisse's Blue Nude and Picasso's Les Demoiselles d'Avignon, both from 1907. In these works, the nude becomes a symbolic, conceptual element, a reference to the purity of life without rules, without constrictions, a return to nature, to the subjective perception of art. The reduction of the human figure to basic, schematic forms initiated in these two works the path towards the abstraction of form, which will be reduced to basic lines and geometric structures, such as Constantine Brâncuşi's Nude, where a female torso is reduced to a simple cylindrical shape.

Fauvism (1905–1908)

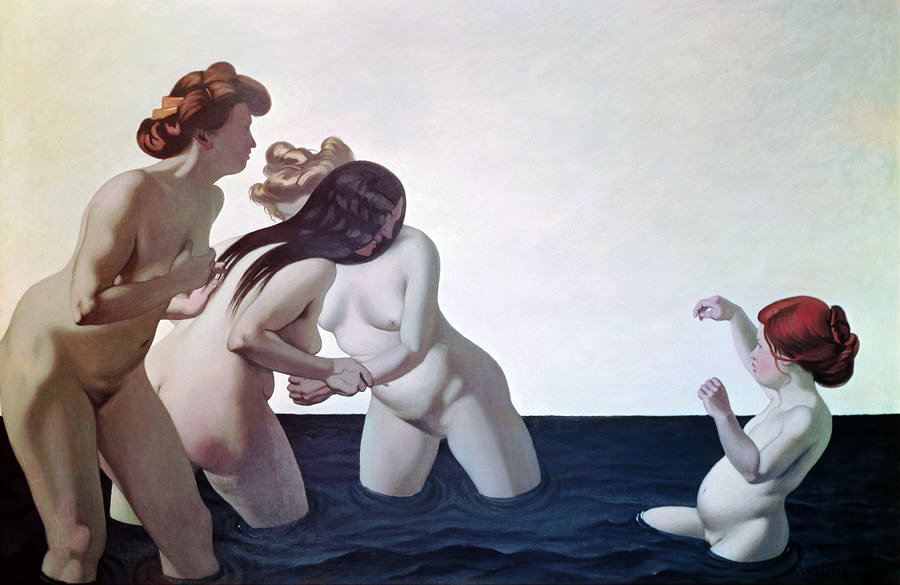
Three Women and a Little Girl Playing in the Water (1907), by Felix Vallotton, Kunstmuseum, Basel.

Fauvism is considered the first avant-garde movement. (Note: The "historical avant-gardes" are those produced between the pre-war period at the beginning of the century (around 1905–1910) and the end of World War II (Arnaldo, Javier (1993). "Las vanguardias históricas I" (Magazine) (in Spanish). Madrid: Historia 16: 6.)) The Fauves dispensed with perspective, modeling and chiaroscuro, experimenting with color, which is conceived in a subjective and personal way, applying emotional and expressive values, independent of nature. Its main representative was Henri Matisse, a disciple of Gustave Moreau, who opened the doors to the independence of color with respect to the subject, organizing space according to color planes and seeking new sensations through the striking effect of violent areas of strident colors. Despite his modernizing zeal, Matisse preserved classical elements, such as the nude: in 1898, he began his personal style with Nude at the Window, where he began to apply color in an arbitrary, non-imitative way; the painting recreates a different reality, in which color is autonomous from form. In Luxury, Calm and Pleasure (1905), he applied basic colors (red, yellow, blue) and complementary colors (violet, orange, green), arranged by zones and structured by geometric figures. With the Blue Nude (1906–1907) he began a simplification of the human form in search of a perfect synthesis of the structure of the body; this process that would obsess him for many years and that would culminate in the Pink Nude (1935). In The Luxury (1907) he focused on the human figure, with a triangular composition and arbitrary colors, emphasizing the movement of the figure, and with schematic faces. Luxury II (1907) is a second, more precise version, with pure, flat spots of color, highlighting the flesh of salmon pink, which would be typical of Matisse. Bathers with a Turtle (1908) has an austere, abstract background of colored stripes, creating space by the distinction of colors. Nude, Black and Gold (1908) is influenced by black-African carvings, with a tone close to wood and almond-shaped eyes. The Dance (1910) is a study of the human figure in movement, with an exaggerated schematism and great austerity of color, reduced to red and blue—he made two large murals on The Dance, one in Moscow (1910) and another in Philadelphia (1931). Odalisque in Red (1924) is influenced by Modigliani, softened with a certain Renaissance air. In Figure on an Ornamental Background (1925), he recovered Moreau's influence, with great decorativism and horror vacui. In Pink Nude (1935), the influence of Mondrian is evident, with abstract figures and a gridded background rendered in black and white. Other works of his are: The Joy of Life (1906), Standing Nude (1907), Game of Bowls (1908), Two Black Women (1908), Still Life with Dance (1909), Nude in Sunlit Landscape (1909), Red Fish and Sculpture (1911), Nude Spanish Carpet (1919), The Hindu Pose (1923), Nude with Blue Cushion (1924), Odalisque with Red Pants (1924–1925), Sleeping Nude on Red Background (1926), Reclining Nude (1935), A Nude Lying on Her Back (1944), etc.

Artists such as André Derain followed in Matisse's footsteps, whose work shows the influence of primitive art: in The Golden Age (1905), he practiced a certain macropointillism, showing the influence of Matisse's Luxury, Calm and Pleasure. Maurice de Vlaminck had a predilection for pure colors, with a Cézannian volume: in Reclining Nude (1905) and Women Bathing (1908), he made a Matissean treatment of the female nude. Albert Marquet had a more naturalistic style, with a predilection for landscape, although he painted nudes such as: Fauvist Nude (1898), Backlit Nude (1909–1911), and Nude on a Blue Background (1913). Kees van Dongen was a passionate nude painter, counting on countless models from Parisian high society, where he was very fashionable in the interwar period. His works include: The Jeweled Woman (1905), Anita (1905), Naked Girl (1907), etc.

Expressionism (1905–1923)

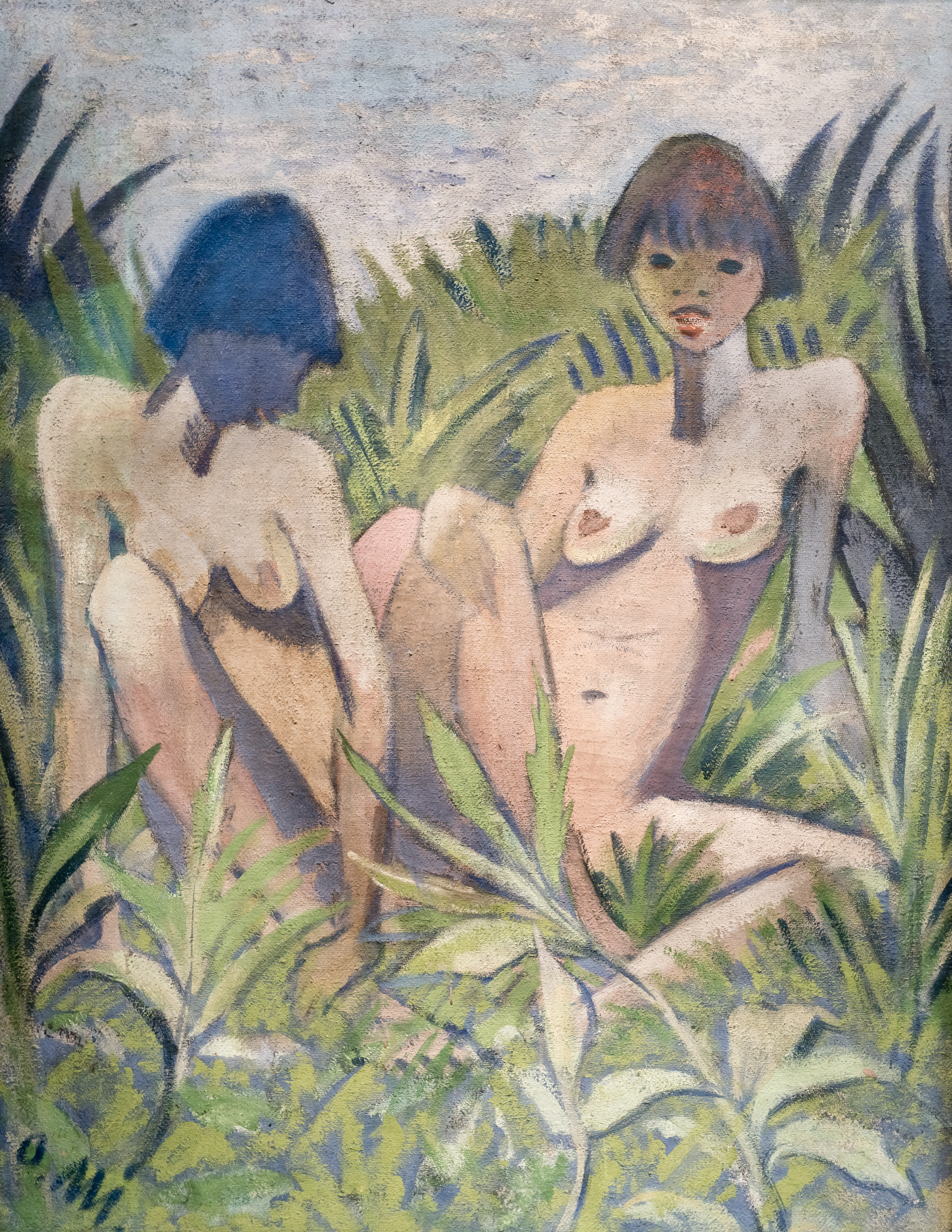
Two Girls in the Grass (1926), by Otto Mueller.

Emerging as a reaction to Impressionism, the Expressionists defended a more personal and intuitive art, where the artist's inner vision—the "expression"—predominated over the representation of reality—the "impression"—reflecting in their works a personal and intimate theme with a taste for the fantastic, deforming reality to accentuate the expressive character of the work. In Germany, his main centers of diffusion were organized around two groups: Die Brücke (founded in 1905) and Der Blaue Reiter (founded in 1911), although some artists did not belong to either group.

The members of Die Brücke were interested in a type of subject matter centered on life and nature, reflected spontaneously and instinctively, so their main themes were the nude—whether indoors or outdoors—as well as circus and music hall scenes, where they found the maximum intensity they could extract from life. This subject matter was synthesized in works about bathers that its members made during their stays in the lakes near Dresden between 1909 and 1911: Alsen, Dangast, Nidden, Fehmarn, Hiddensee, Moritzburg, etc. They are works in which they express an unabashed naturism—in line with the Wandervögel, life in the countryside stripped of taboos and prejudices—an almost pantheistic feeling of communion with nature, while technically refining their palette, in a process of subjective deformation of form and color, which acquires a symbolic meaning. In Kirchner's words, his objective was "to study the nude, the foundation of all the plastic arts, in a natural way".

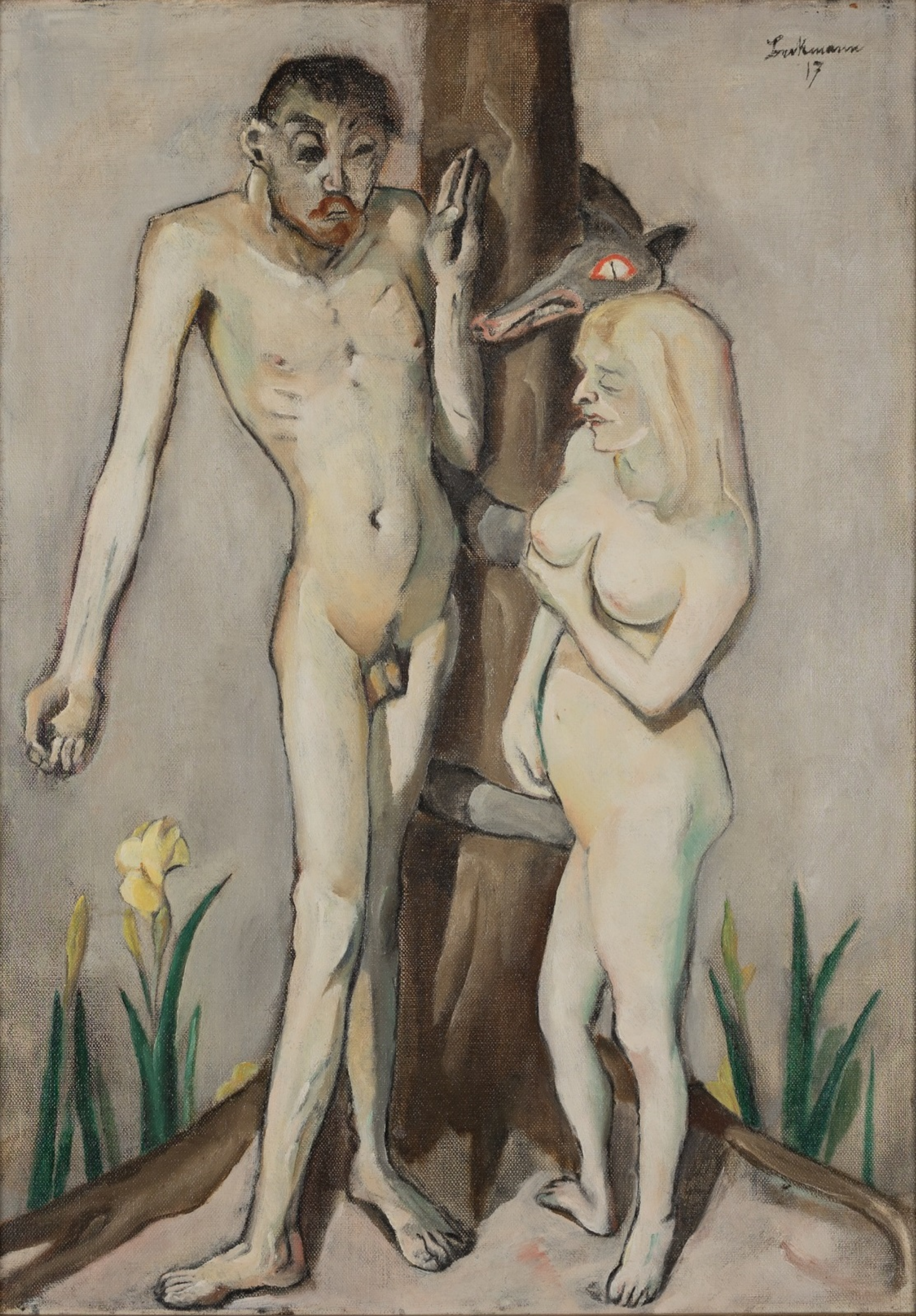
Adam and Eve (1917), by Max Beckmann.

A precursor of expressionism was Edvard Munch: influenced in his beginnings by impressionism and symbolism, he soon drifted towards a personal style that would be a faithful reflection of his obsessive and tortured interior, with scenes of oppressive and enigmatic atmosphere—centered on sex, illness and death—characterized by the sinuosity of the composition and a strong and arbitrary coloring. In Madonna (1895–1904) he presented a female figure with a naked torso, in an ambiguous attitude, while the body suggests sensuality, the face with closed eyes turned upwards gives a sense of mysticism, of introspection; in the frame is a fetus, which together with a line of sperm suggest the artist's rejection of the traditional attitude of men towards women. In Puberty (1914), he portrayed an adolescent girl with a languid look, reflecting in her countenance the meditative and perplexed state that marks the passage from girl to woman, whose deep psychological introspection the artist has masterfully recreated with pure colors and distorting lines. It belongs to a series of works made between 1890 and 1908, with which Munch intended to develop a "frieze of human life", determined to analyze all the problems arising from loneliness, illness, addictions, unsatisfied love, and the anguish of age—especially in adolescence and old age. These works denote a great psychological analysis, but they reveal a certain morbid and disturbing component, exploring without qualms the deepest depths of man's interior.

The work of Emil Nolde was also an antecedent: at the beginning of the century, he used the divisionist technique, with very thick impasto and short brushstrokes, and with strong chromatic discharge, of post-impressionist influence. Later, he abandoned the imitation of reality, denoting in his work an inner restlessness, a vital tension, a tension reflected in the work's internal pulse. This can be seen in nudes such as: Dance around the Golden Calf (1910), Still Life with Dancers (1914), and The Enthusiast (1919). Another reference was Lovis Corinth: trained in impressionism—of which he was one of the main figures in Germany along with Max Liebermann and Max Slevogt—he drifted in his maturity towards expressionism with a series of works of psychological introspection, with a theme centered on the erotic and macabre. Although he remained anchored in the optical impression as a method of creating his works, the expressiveness became increasingly important, culminating in The Red Christ (1922), a religious scene of remarkable anguish, close to the visions of Nolde. Other works of his are Reclining nude (1895) and Salome (1899).

Among the members of Die Brücke, Ernst Ludwig Kirchner stood out: a great draughtsman, since his visit to an exhibition of Dürer's woodcuts in 1898 he began to make woodcuts, material in which he also made carvings of African influence, with an irregular, unpolished finish, highlighting the sexual components (Ballerina, 1911). As a painter, he used primary colors, like the Fauvists, with a certain influence of Matisse, but with broken, violent lines—unlike Matisse's rounded ones—in closed, acute angles, with stylized figures, with an elongation of Gothic influence. Among his works it is worth mentioning: Couple on the Sofa (1908), Young Woman under a Japanese Umbrella (1909), Marzella (1909–1910), Bathers in the room (1909–1920), Bathers in Moritzburg (1909–1926), Reclining Nude in Front of a Mirror (1910), Nudes in the Sun (1910–1920), Nudes in the Country (1910–1920), Two Nudes with Bathtube and Oven (1911), Nude with a Black Hat (1911–1912), The Judgment of Paris (1912), Three Bathers (1913), etc.

Other members of Die Brücke were: Erich Heckel, who, between 1906 and 1907, made a series of paintings with a Van Goghian composition, short brushstrokes, and intense colors—predominantly yellow—with dense paste. Later he evolved to more expressionist themes, such as sex, loneliness and isolation: Bathers in the Reeds (1909), Female Nudes by the Pond (1910), Seaside Scene (Bathing Women) (1912), The Crystalline Day (1913). Karl Schmidt-Rottluff practiced macropointillism in his beginnings, to move on to an expressionism of schematic figures and sharp faces, with loose brushstrokes and intense colors: Woman in Tub (1912), After Swimming (1912), Four Bathers on the Beach (1913). Max Pechstein made a trip to Oceania in 1914, receiving as many other artists of the time the influence of primitive and exotic art: Woman and Indian on a carpet (1909), Outdoors (Bathers in Moritzburg) (1910), Three nudes in a landscape (1911), Sunrise (1911), The Dance, dancers and bathers in the forest pond (1912), Triptych of Palau (1917). Otto Mueller made works on landscapes and nudes with schematic and angular forms where the influence of Cézanne and Picasso can be perceived. His nudes are usually set in natural landscapes, showing the influence of Gauguin's exotic nature. His slender figures are inspired by Cranach, of whose Venus he had a reproduction in his studio. They are nudes of great simplicity and naturalness, without traits of provocation or sensuality, expressing an ideal perfection, the nostalgia of a lost paradise, in which the human being lived in communion with nature: Three nudes in the forest (1911), Girls sitting by the water (1913), Bathing Girls in the Forest Pond (1915), Young woman in the rose bushes (1918), Two girls sitting in the dunes (1922), Two girls in the grass (1926).

Outside the main expressionist groups was the work of Paula Modersohn-Becker: in some visits to Paris between 1900 and 1906 she was influenced by Cézanne, Gauguin and Maillol, combining in a personal way the three-dimensional forms of Cézanne and the linear designs of Gauguin, mainly in portraits and maternal scenes, as well as nudes, evocative of a new conception in the relationship of the body with nature, as in Mother Kneeling with Child (1907). In Vienna, Egon Schiele, a disciple of Klimt, stood out, whose work revolved around a theme based on sexuality, loneliness and isolation, with a certain air of voyeurism, with very explicit works for which he was even imprisoned, accused of pornography. Dedicated mainly to drawing, he gave the line an essential role, on which he based his compositions, with stylized figures immersed in an oppressive, tense space. He recreated a reiterative human typology, with an elongated, schematic canon, far from naturalism, with vivid, exalted colors, emphasizing the linear character, the contour. Some of his works among his extensive production are: Nude young woman with her arms on her chest (1910), Nude lying down with her arms backwards (1911), Two girls (1911), Seated female nude (1914), Two women embracing (1915), Nude lying down (1917), The embrace (1917), etc.

In sculpture, Georg Kolbe stood out, especially dedicated to the nude, with dynamic figures, in rhythmic movements close to ballet, with a vitalist, cheerful, and healthy attitude. His most famous work was Morning, exhibited in the German Pavilion built by Ludwig Mies van der Rohe for the 1929 Barcelona International Exposition. On the other hand, the Norwegian Gustav Vigeland made between 1924 and 1942 an extraordinary sculptural ensemble in the Frogner Park in Oslo, called the Vigeland installation, with more than a hundred naked figures, representing human life analyzed in the various stages and ages of life, from childhood to old age, with a serene and confident style, healthy and optimistic, expressing without prejudice or moralizing the full and natural meaning of life.

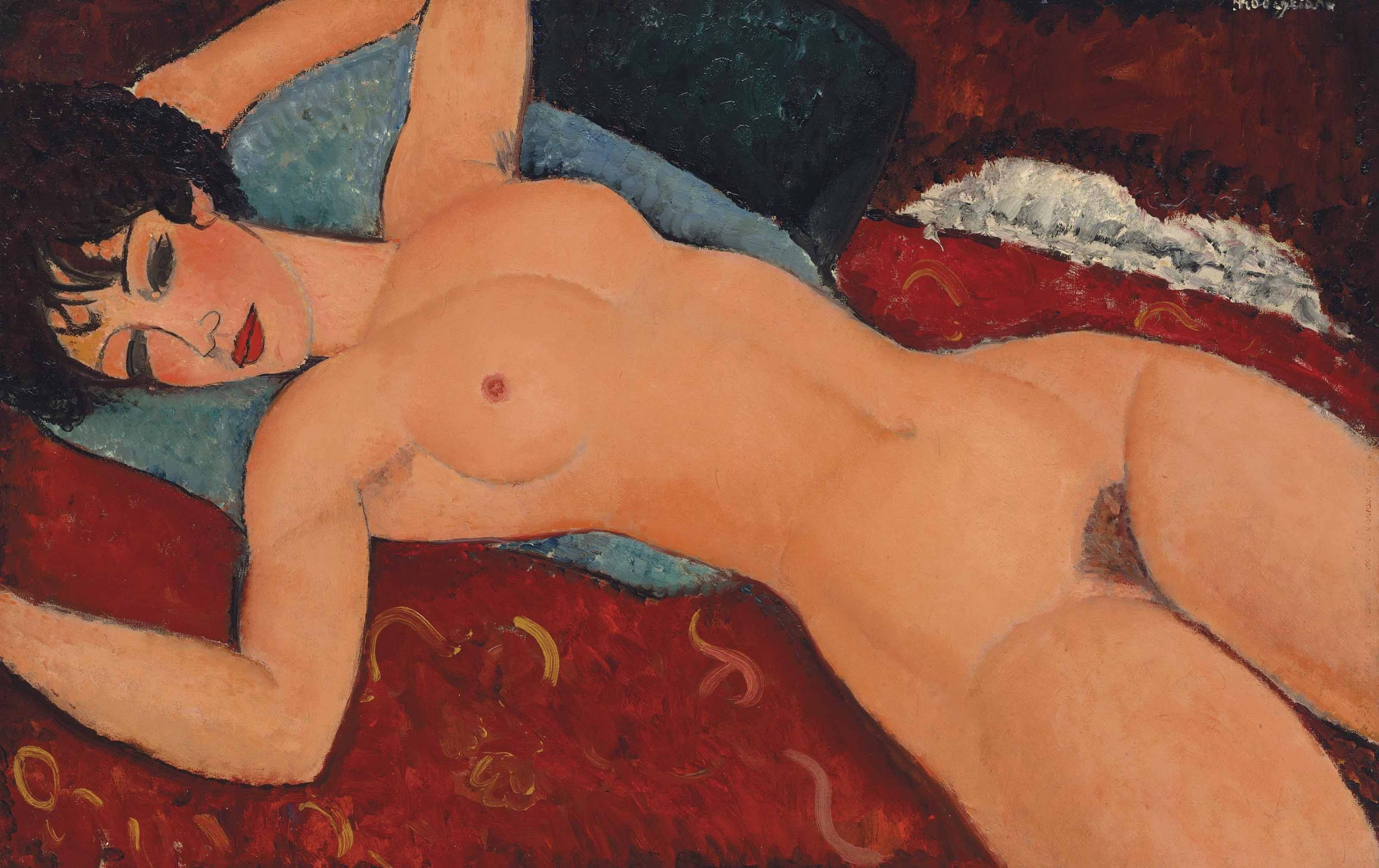
Red Nude (1917), by Amedeo Modigliani, Gianni Mattioli Collection, Milan.

In France, the so-called School of Paris was formed, a heterodox group of artists who worked in the interwar period, linked to various artistic styles such as post-impressionism, expressionism, cubism, and surrealism. One of its main exponents was Amedeo Modigliani, an artist of bohemian life, immersed in sex, drugs, and alcohol. He received classical training, influenced by Mannerism and the Venetian school. In 1902, he studied at the Scuola Libera di Nuodo in Florence, dedicated especially to the nude. In his works he strongly emphasized the outline, with fluid lines, heirs of the modernist arabesque, while the space was formed by juxtaposition of color planes, with elongated figures inspired by the Italian masters of the Cinquecento. Among his works are: Painful Nude (1908), Seated Nude (1910), Caryatid (1913–1914), Red Nude (1917), Nude Sitting on a Divan (1917), Nude with Necklace (1917), Nude Lying on a Blue Cushion (1917), Nude Lying on Her Back (1917), Reclining Nude (1919), etc.

Other members of the School of Paris were: Marc Chagall, who made works of a dreamlike character, close to a certain surrealism, distorting reality at his whim, in scenes that are in an unreal space, outside the rules of perspective or scale, in a world where he evokes his childhood memories, mixed with the world of dreams, music and poetry: Nude over Vitebsk (1933), To my wife (1933), White Crucifixion (1938). Georges Rouault was initially linked to symbolism (Stella matutina, 1895) and Fauvism, but his moral themes—centered on religion—and his dark colors brought him closer to expressionism. His most emblematic works are those of female nudes, which have a bitter, unpleasant air, with languid, whitish figures (Odaliscas, 1907). Between 1903 and 1904, he executed several paintings of naked prostitutes where he recreates the depravity of their trade, reflecting the materiality of the flesh horrendously, stripped of any ideal or moral component, with a sense of denunciation of the decadence of society coming from his neo-Catholic ideology, in an expressionist style of quick strokes and basic lines. His works are: Nude in the Mirror (1906), Young Woman (1906) and Autumn (1936). Jules Pascin expressed in his work the rootlessness and alienation of the exiled, as well as the sexual obsessions that marked him since his adolescence. He had a delicate technique, with a finely suggested line and a color of iridescent tones, showing in his nudes a languid and evanescent air, with a certain Degasian influence: Manolita (1929). We should also remember Marcel Gromaire, author of nudes of sensual and vigorous forms, with a predominance of ocher and yellow colors (Nude with an Oriental Tapestry, 1926; Blond Nude, 1926; Nude with Coat, 1929); and Tsuguharu Foujita, who made a synthesis of the Japanese and Western traditions, with precise graphics and a glossy finish, as if it were lacquer (The Salon of Montparnasse, 1928).

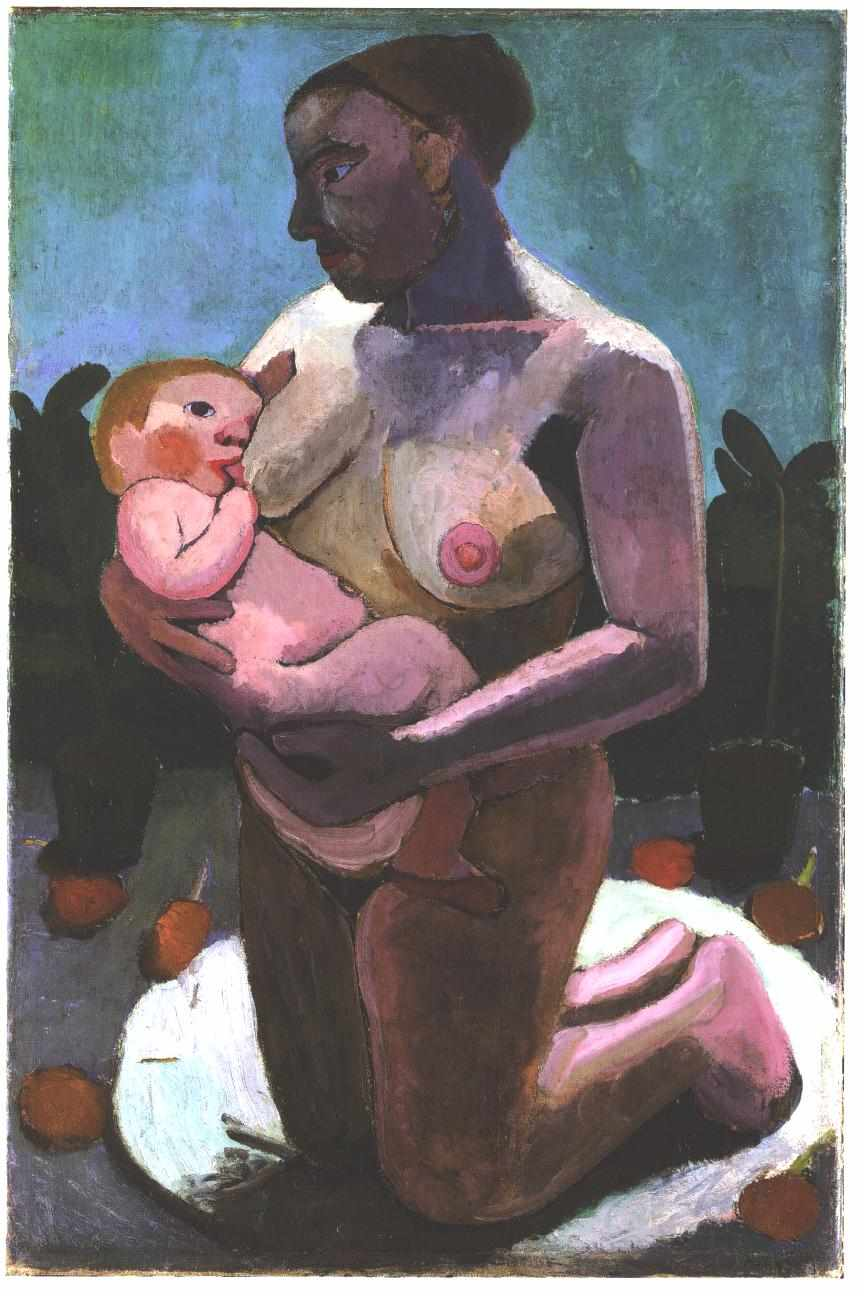
Kneeling Mother with Child (1907), by Paula Modersohn-Becker, Alte Nationalgalerie, Staatliche Museen zu Berlin, Berlin.

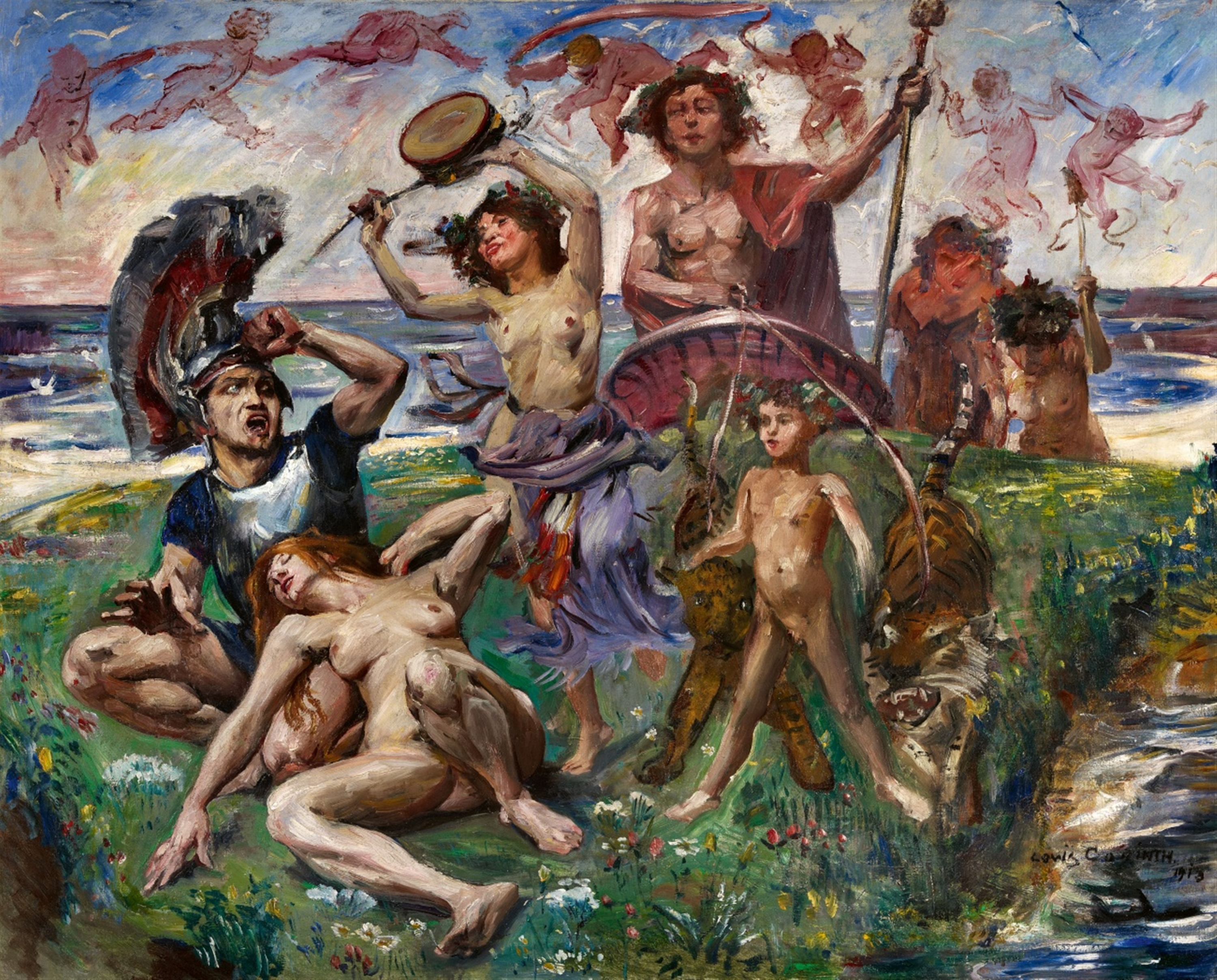
Ariadne in Naxos (1913), by Lovis Corinth, private collection.

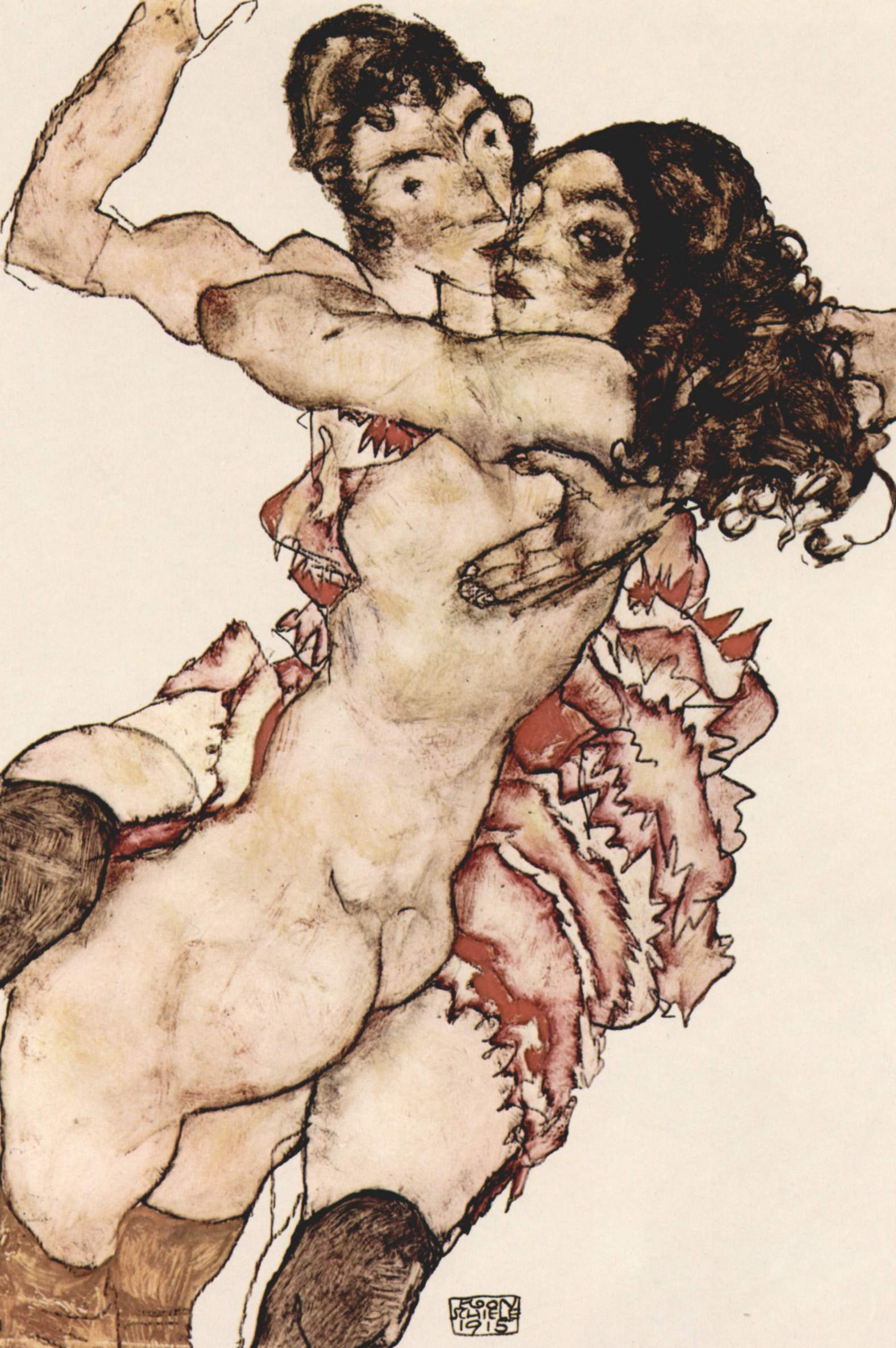
Two Women Embracing (1915), by Egon Schiele, Hungarian Museum of Fine Arts, Budapest.

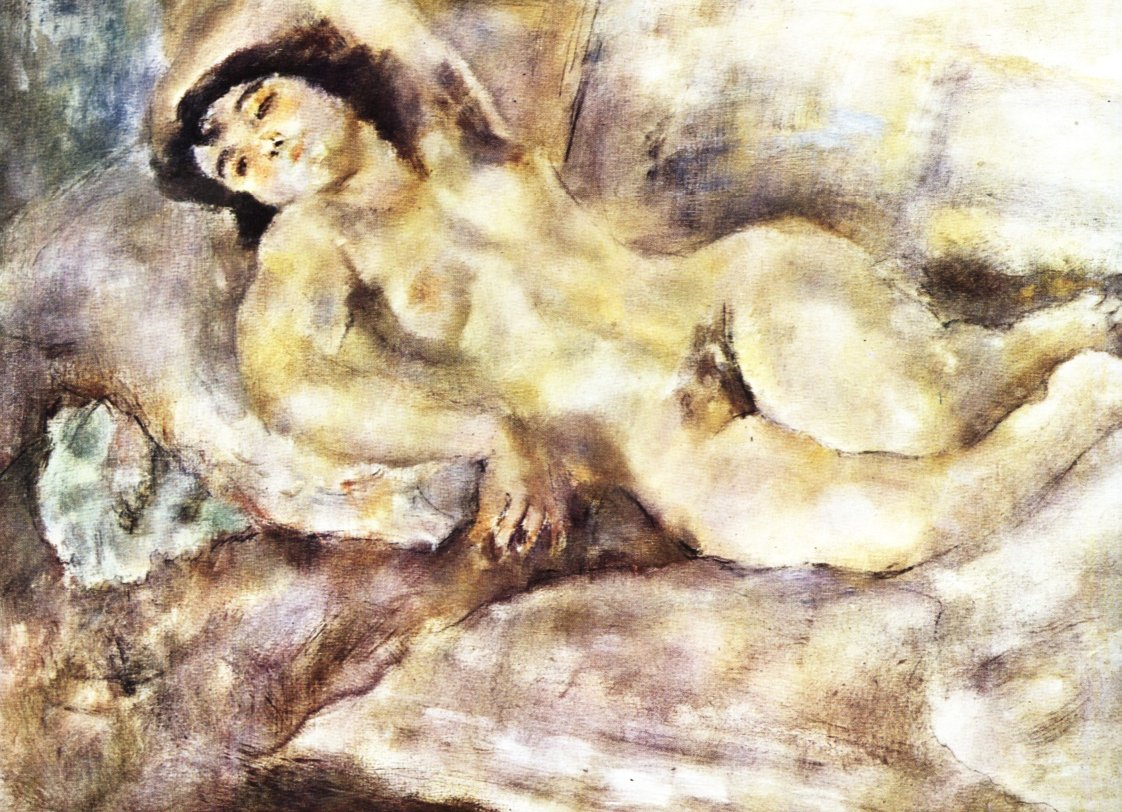
Manolita (1929), by Jules Pascin, Musée National d'Art Moderne, Paris.

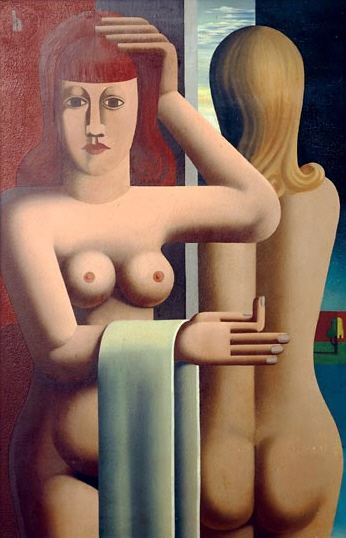
Two Women (1930), by Heinrich Hoerle, Museum Ludwig, Cologne.

Cubism (1907–1914)

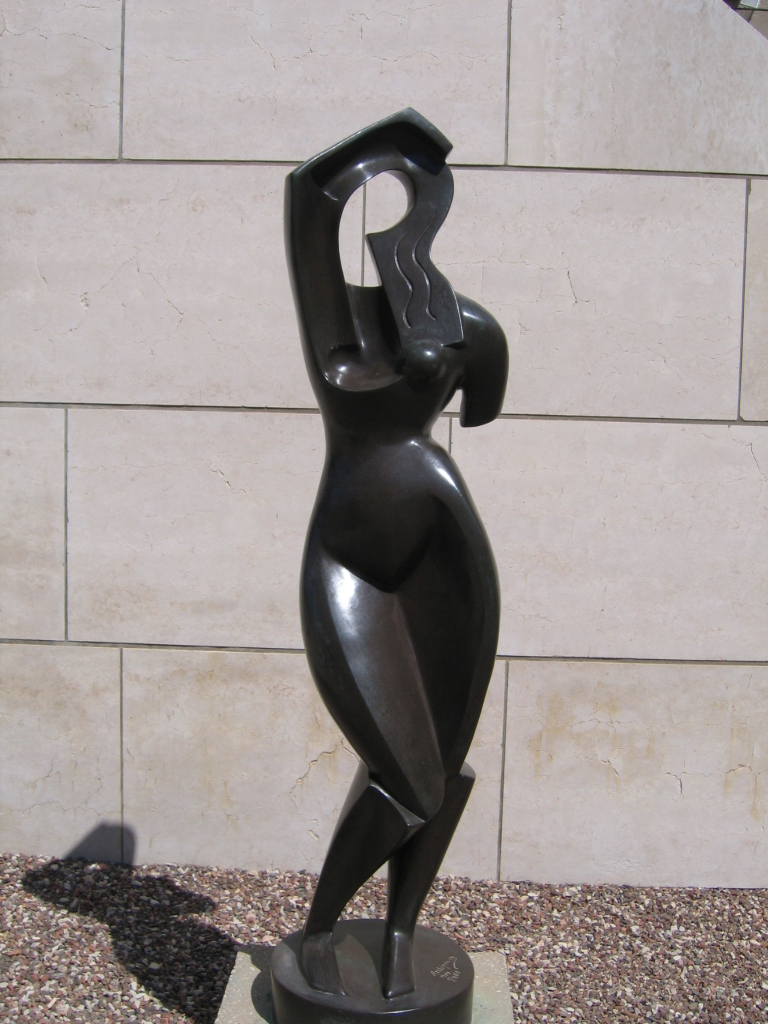
Woman Combing Her Hair (1915), by Alexander Archipenko, Israel Museum, Jerusalem.

This movement was based on the deformation of reality through the destruction of the spatial perspective of Renaissance origin, organizing space according to a geometric grid, with simultaneous vision of objects, a range of cold and muted colors, and a new conception of the work of art, with the introduction of collage. Its main exponent was Pablo Picasso: of academic training (Female nude from back, 1899; Seated female nude, 1899), he went through several periods before ending up in Cubism, of which it is worth remembering for the theme of the nude his "pink period", of a classicism influenced by Ingres, with themes set in the world of the circus and the Impressionist toilette: Saltimbanquis (1904), Harlequin's Family (1905), Dutchess with a Coif (1905), Boy Leading a Horse (1905), Woman, Fernande Olivier (1905), Two Nudes (1906), The Harem (1906), The Two Brothers (1906), Nude Wringing Her Hair (1906), Nude with Joined Hands (1906). In 1907, he painted The Young Ladies of Avignon, which was a total break with traditional art, making a plea against conventional beauty, beauty based on rules and proportions. Already, the chosen theme—a brothel—is symptomatic of protest and rebellion, but also of the treatment of the figures, deformed and reduced to simple geometric bodies (cube, cylinder), which denotes his desire to demystify the classical concept of beauty. In this work, Picasso shows a strong influence of African sculpture, with stylized forms and simple lines of geometric construction, a more intuitive than realistic sense of the body's representation, and a style that evokes the soul's presence more than physical corporeality. However, the dismemberment of the bodies is not random, but subject to laws of refraction, framed in sharp contours and concave planes taken from the spatiality of African art.

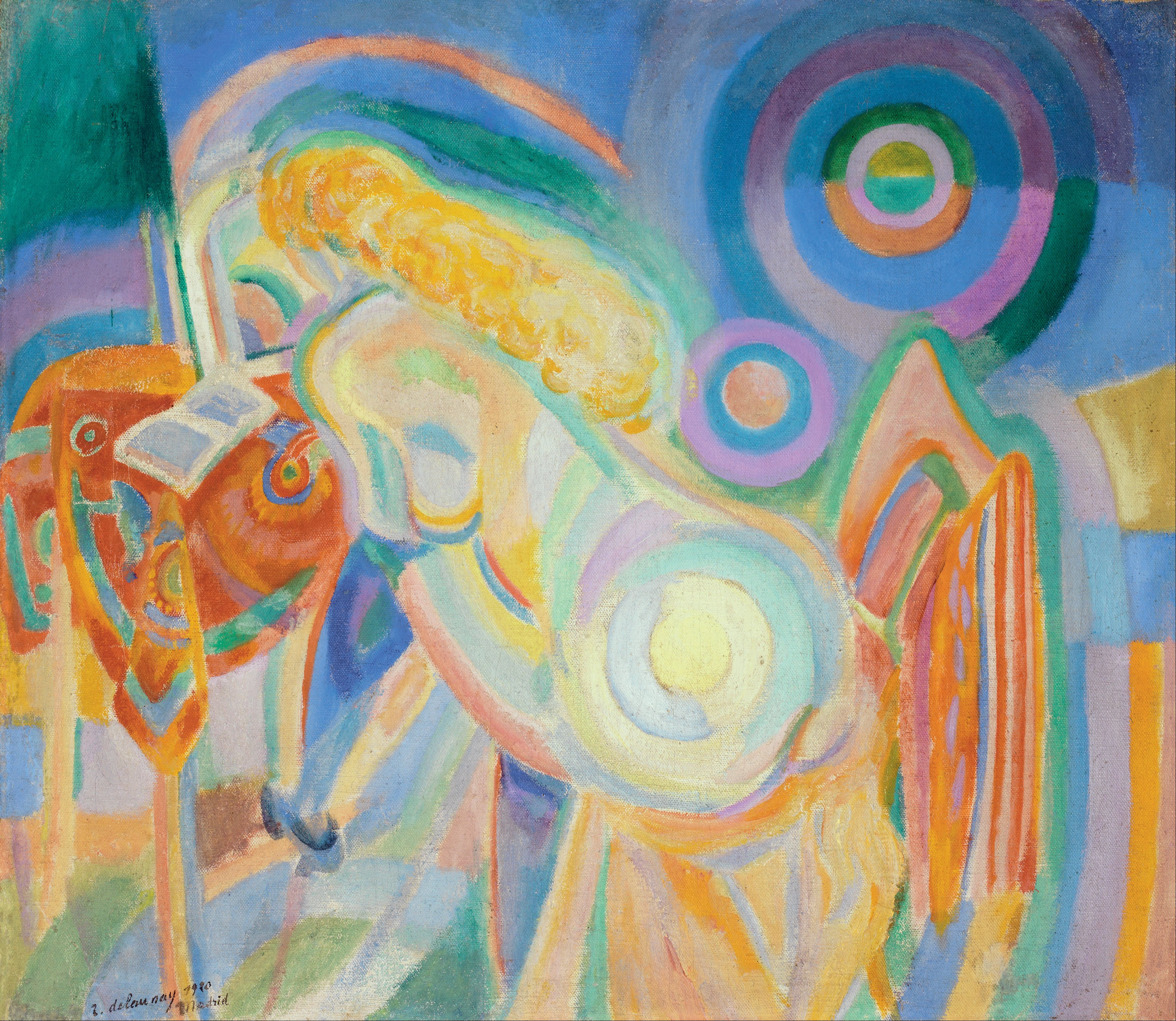
Nude Woman Reading (1920), by Robert Delaunay, Bilbao Fine Arts Museum.

The Young Ladies of Avignon began the so-called "black period" of Picasso, a brief period until his fully cubist stage, in which he also made Nude with Cloths (1907), Three Women (1908), and The Dryad (Nude in the Forest) (1908). From the fully cubist period, Nude (1910) and Woman in a Shirt (1913) stand out, although at this stage he did not dedicate himself especially to the nude. Later, after a visit to Pompeii in 1917, he rediscovered the freshness and the vital component of primitive classical art. In his drawing of the Bathers that year, he composed more naturalistic forms, though stylized and treated with the artistic freedom of his original creativity. During the early 1920s, he made nudes in a more classical vein, as in his illustrations of Ovid and Aristophanes. Still, they were nudes of a voluntary objectivity that deprived them of vitality, which would be reaffirmed when he later returned to the deformation of his figures, as in his Nude Woman in a Red Armchair of 1929, whose distortion seems deliberately cruel and demystifying. This work is no longer an attempt against the classical nude, but against the contemporary nude, since the setting where the figure is located is reminiscent of Matisse's Odalisques painted a few years earlier. Here we can perceive the rebellious, iconoclastic Picasso, always in search of new paths and against all conventionalism, whether of the past or the present. In this sense, he made several versions of classic works of art history, such as Parody of Manet's "Olympia" (1901–1903), The Venus in the Mirror (1932) and Le Déjeuner sur l'herbe (1961). From here Picasso began an increasingly abstracted path of the human figure, subjected to an increasingly distorting process, as can be seen in the series of lithographs Les Deux Femmes nues (1945–1946), which presents a sleeping figure lying down and another sitting awake—perhaps an allusion to the myth of Cupid and Psyche—which in successive phases is shown from naturalistic forms to almost abstraction. Other works of his are: Seated Bathing Girl (1930), Nude (1932), The Muse (1935), Figures on the Beach (1937), Woman Combing Her Hair (1940), Massacre in Korea (1951), Women of Algiers (1955), Women Grooming (1956), Nude under a Pine Tree (1959), etc.

Other representatives of Cubism were: Georges Braque, initiator of the style with Picasso, whose Large Nude (1908) has a great parallelism with The Young Ladies of Avignon, with African influence and a certain totemic air, with a rhythmic movement. Fernand Léger recreated in his works a volumetric structure of form based on tubes—which is why his style was called "tubism": Nude in the Forest (1910), Nude Model in the Studio (1912–1913), Three Women at Breakfast (1921), Nudes on a Red Background (1923), The Three Women on a Red Background (1927), Two Women Holding Flowers (1954). Robert Delaunay made in The City of Paris (1910) a curious mixture of figuration and geometric abstraction, with a space structured into blocks, and a nuanced chromaticism that blurs the forms in the surrounding environment. Joan Miró went through Fauvism and Cubism before arriving at Surrealism, his best known stage: Seated Nude Holding a Flower (1917), Nude with a Mirror (1919), Standing Nude (1921).

In sculpture, Alexander Archipenko was the creator of "construction", the sculptural variant of collage. In Woman Walking (1912), he introduced a new analysis of the human figure, broken down into geometric forms and perforated at certain points with holes that create a contrast between the solid and the hollow, in a new way of understanding matter. In Woman Combing Her Hair (1915) he followed the cubistic criteria of The Young Ladies of Avignon, and in Seated Woman (1916) he experimented with concave space, while in Female Torso (1922) he accentuated the stylization of the figure, a process that culminated in Torso in Space (1935). Julio González used iron plates in his sculpture to simulate the epidermis, in parts of the human body that denote the absence of what would be the body as a whole, an effect accentuated by the emptiness of the work (Female Bust, 1934; Torso, 1936). Henri Laurens worked in a variety of materials, from wood and metal to papiers collés and tableaux-objets, mixed methods and assemblages, often painted afterwards (sculpto-peintures). Along with other works, the female figure was one of his greatest sources of inspiration, as in Woman with a Fan (1921), Squatting Woman (1922), and Nude with Mirror (1922).

Futurism (1909–1930)

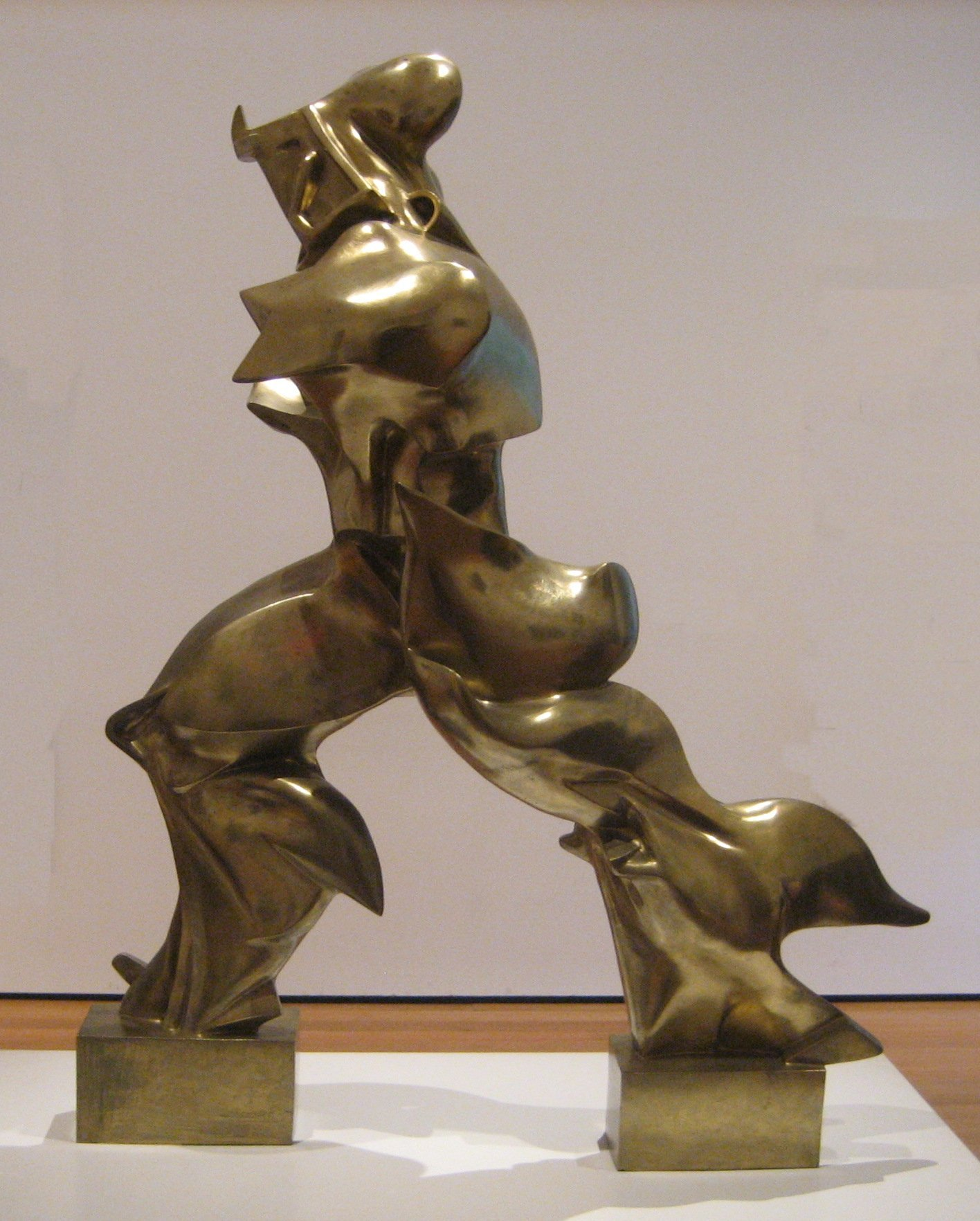
Unique Forms of Continuity in Space (1913), by Umberto Boccioni, Museum of Modern Art (MoMA), New York.

An Italian movement that exalted the values of the technical and industrial progress of the 20th century, highlighting aspects of reality such as movement, speed, and simultaneity of action, Futurism aspired to transform the world, to change life, and to show an idealistic, somewhat utopian concept of art as the engine of society. Although the Futurists were not particularly dedicated to the nude, it is worth remembering Umberto Boccioni and his Unique Forms of Continuity in Space (1913), a modern version of the classical "heroic nudity", with which he sought "the abolition of the finite line and the closed statue", giving his figure a centrifugal force. With this sculpture, Boccioni sought to go beyond the impression of movement, exploring the notion of speed and force in sculpture, seeking to assign luminous values to the carved surface. The sculpture exceeds the corporeal limits of the human being and resembles a flag waving in the wind. It seems that the body represented meanders, struggling against an invisible force. Although the (physical) result is a three-dimensional portrait, the moving body introduces a fourth dimension, time.

Dadaism (1916–1922)

In response to the disasters of World War I, Dadaism meant a radical approach to art that rejected any component based on logic or reason, claiming doubt, chance, and the absurdity of existence. This translates into a subversive language, where both the themes and the traditional techniques of art are questioned, experimenting with new materials and new forms of composition, such as collage, photomontage and ready-made. Its main factor was Marcel Duchamp, who after a Fauvist phase (Nude with Black Stockings, 1910; Young Girl and Man in Spring, 1911; The Thicket, 1910–1911), realized in Nude Descending a Staircase (1911) a synthesis between Cubism and Futurism, where the body has been decomposed into geometric volumes and serialized in various superimposed movements. In this work, Duchamp distances himself from reality, where the nude has no significance; it is only a means of experimentation. In The King and Queen with Swift Nudes (1912), he represented the human figure as chess pieces. One of his most famous works is The Large Glass (or The Bride Stripped Bare by Her Bachelors, Even, 1915–1923), abstract nude formed by two sheets of glass joined by a lead frame, and placed in a glass box, installed in the Philadelphia Museum of Art. According to the instruction book left by the author, the bride undresses to excite the bachelors who court he. However,h their physical separation prevents them from consummating their love, thereby conveying a clear message of the futility of human passions and how the human being transits through life in solitude. Another emblematic work of his was Given: 1. The Waterfall, 2. The Illuminating Gas (1944–1966), an installation with various materials (a wooden door, a gas lamp, bricks, leather, firewood, plexiglass), which presents a woman's body lying on some bushes, seen through a hole in the door, in reference to woman as something inaccessible, enigmatic.

Other exponents of Dadaism were: Francis Picabia, a subversive artist with a strong individualistic temperament, author of nudes such as Woman and Idol (1940), The brunette and blonde (1941), Two Nudes (1941), Nudes (1942), and Five Women (1942). Man Ray was a painter, sculptor, and photographer, one of the most original of the movement, with an overflowing creative fantasy. One of his most famous sculptures is Venus Restored (1936), a woman's torso reminiscent of a Greek Venus, bound by ropes that encircle her entire body.

Surrealism (1924–1955)

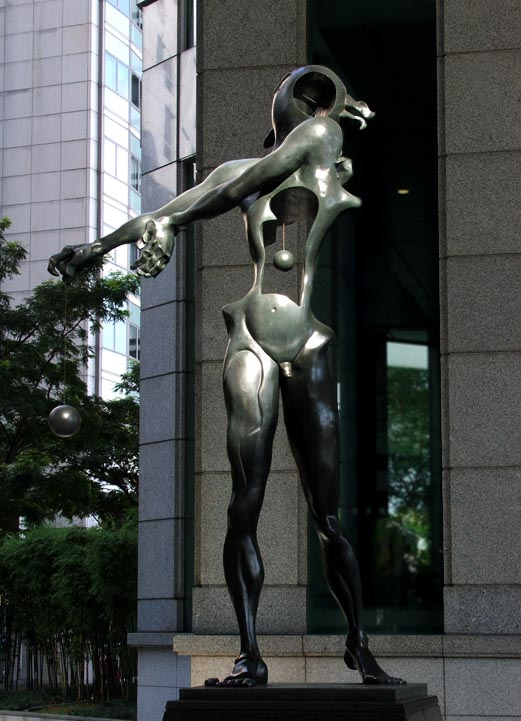
Homage to Newton (1985), by Salvador Dalí, Singapore.

Surrealism placed special emphasis on imagination, fantasy, and the world of dreams, with a strong influence of psychoanalysis, as can be seen in its concept of "automatic writing", by which they try to express themselves by freeing their minds from any rational bondage, to show the purity of the unconscious. One of his precursors was Giorgio de Chirico, initiator of the so-called metaphysical painting, with works of disturbing atmosphere, with empty spaces and strange perspectives, and anthropoid figures resembling mannequins: Perseus and Andromeda (1910), Ariana, The Silent Statue (1913), Roman Women (1926), Nude Woman (1929), Nude Self-Portrait (1942), School of Gladiators (1953).

Salvador Dalí was one of the great geniuses of 20th-century art, with a megalomaniac and histrionic personality that turned him into a media figure, extolling him as a paradigm of the eccentric artist. He had an academic education, and his first works of adolescence were close to pointillist impressionism (The Picnic, 1921; Muse of Cadaqués, 1921; Nude in a Landscape, 1922–1923; Bathers of La Costa Brava, 1923). Later, he quickly went through various phases related to avant-garde movements, from Fauvism and Cubism to Futurism and metaphysical painting (Cubist Composition, 1923, inspired by Matisse's The Dance; Female Nude, 1925; Venus with Cupids, 1925). In 1928, he settled in Paris, where he entered surrealism, of which he would be one of its main representatives, and the following year, he met Gala Éluard, who would be his great muse, and whom he portrayed on numerous occasions, some of them nude. At that time, he began to show interest in Freudian psychoanalysis, inventing a method of dream interpretation that he called the "paranoiac-critical method". Much of his psychological reflections center on sex, a recurring theme in his work, which revolves around the Freudian struggle between the principle of pleasure and the principle of reality. Most of his works are from the surrealist phase: The Great Masturbator (1929), The Bleeding Roses (1930), Untitled (William Tell and Gradiva) (1931), Masochistic Instrument (1933–1934),The Dream places a Hand on a Man's Shoulder (1936), The Golden Age – Family of Marsupial Centaurs (1940–1941), Costume for a Nude with a Codfish Tail (1941), Honey is Sweeter than Blood (1941), Dream Caused by the Flight of a Bee Around a Pomegranate a Second Before Awakening (1944), Galarina (1944–1945, inspired by Raphael's La Fornarina), The Apotheosis of Homer (1944–1945), My Wife, Naked, Looking at her own Body (1945), The temptation of Saint Anthony (1946), etc.

Between 1940 and 1955, he lived in the United States, where, from 1947, he became interested in religious mysticism, atomic physics, and perspectives based on the golden section. From this period are works such as: Leda Atomica (1949, on the myth of Leda and the swan, where Leda is his wife, Gala), The Judgment of Paris (1950), Crucifixion (Corpus Hypercubus) (1954), Dalí, nude (1954), Two Adolescents (1954). He later returned to Spain, where he devoted himself to the task of founding a museum, the Dalí Theater-Museum in Figueres, while continuing to work: Gala Nude From Behind Looking in an Invisible Mirror (1960), Untitled (St. John) (1964), Tuna Fishing (1966–1967), The Hallucinogenic Toreador (1968–1970), Three Hyper-Realist Graces (1973), Standing Female Nude (1974), Gala Contemplating the Mediterranean Sea Which at Twenty Meters Becomes the Portrait of Abraham Lincoln – Homage to Rothko (1974–1975),Dalí's Hand Drawing Back the Golden Fleece in the Form of a Cloud to Show Gala the Dawn, Completely Nude, Very, Very Far Away Behind the Sun (1977, inspired by Claude Lorrain's Landscape with St Paula of Rome Embarking at Ostia), Imperial Monument to the Child Woman (1977, based on Bouguereau's Les Oréades). Dalí was also a sculptor (The Bust of a Retrospective Woman, 1933; Hysterical and Aerodynamic, Nude – Woman on the Rock, 1934; Venus de Milo with Drawers, 1936; Michelin's Slave, 1964, with Michelangelo's Dying Slave pierced by a Michelin wheel; Homage to Newton, 1969; Christ Twisted, 1976), and collaborated with photographer Philippe Halsman on several photographic compositions: Cosmic Dali (1948), Human Skull Consisting of Seven Naked Women's Bodies (1951).

Paul Delvaux was framed in a type of figurative painting, but strangely disturbing, where figures that seem to sleepwalk wander through architectural or landscape spaces of perfect artistry, influenced by Piero della Francesca and Renaissance perspective, and where naked women coexist with men who look at them with avid voyeurism, or with skeletons reminiscent of the Baroque genre of vanitas, managing to recreate an atmosphere of nightmarish eroticism. Delvaux conveys a pessimistic vision of love, often relating it to death, in a conjunction of Eros and Thanatos. Thus, in The Sleeping City (1938), he presents a nocturnal city, with classical architecture, where naked women wander like sleepwalkers, representing the myth of the dream woman, unattainable, while a man watches them helplessly. In Pygmalion (1939), he reverses the roles, with a naked woman embracing a male statue. The Congress (1941), despite the realism of the image, recreates a disturbing atmosphere, where naked women walk among a group of men who discuss their affairs without noticing them. In The public road (1948), he presents a reclining Venus reminiscent of those by Giorgione or Titian, but set in the middle of the street, in front of a streetcar advancing towards her. Other works of his are: The Joy of Life (1929), Crisis (1930), Nymphs Bathing (1938), The Visit (1939), Entry into the City (1940), Mermaid in Moonlight (1940), Wedding (1941), Venus Sleeping (1944), The Conversation (1944), Woman before the Mirror (1945), The Enigma (1946), Mermaids (1947), Leda (1948), Dryads (1966), etc.

René Magritte developed a body of work in which the ordinary and banal coexist with the fantastic and strange, often with strong erotic connotations, in disturbing atmospheres with a recurring iconography, thereby highlighting the ambiguity of the objects he portrays. In The Magician's Accomplices (1927), despite the realistic figuration, the artist creates a dreamlike atmosphere, leaving interpretation open to the imagination. In Delusions of Grandeur (1961), he elaborated a female torso sectioned into three parts, which narrow as they ascend, creating a ziggurat shape, like the famous Tower of Babel. Rape (1934) is a face where a naked torso replaces the face, the eyes being the breasts and the mouth the pubis. Other works of his are: Dangerous Liaisons (1926), The Forest (1926), Polar Light (1927), The gigantic days (1928), Collective Invention (1934), Bathing between Light and Darkness (1935), Flowers of the Devil (1946), Sea of Flames (1946), Olympia (1947), The Freedom of the Spirit (1948), The Dress of the Night (1954), etc.

Óscar Domínguez made automatic associations of objects, where figures elongate and acquire a gelatinous consistency, combining humor and desire as motors of human activity. In The electro-sexual sewing machine (1935) he shows a dreamlike delirium where the sexual component is combined with the mechanicity of the industrial era, through a naked woman's body lying face down, with a carnivorous plant devouring her feet and a stream of blood falling on her back through a funnel coming from a bull's head. It is a representation of sadistic eroticism, where sex is mixed with death. The bull represents the primitive, the struggle between life and death, while the machine represents the rational, the triumph of man's will over the surrounding environment.

Other surrealists who practiced the nude were: Max Ernst, who used to work in collage because of his Dadaist training, and who showed a great interest in irrationality and art made by the insane: The Great Lover (1926), Young Nudes (1926), Attirement of the Bride (1940); and André Masson, interested in the automatic way (free association of ideas), with a gesturalist, aggressive work, with interest in sadomasochism: Mathematical Nude (1928), influenced by Miró.

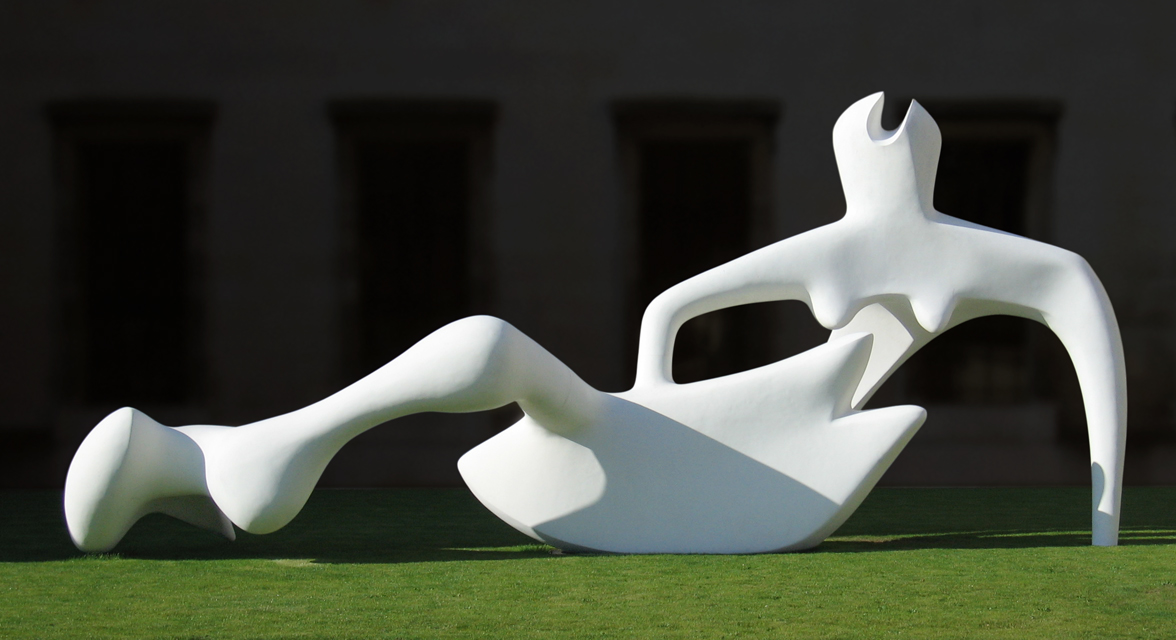
Reclining Figure (1951), by Henry Moore, Fitzwilliam Museum, Cambridge.

In sculpture, Constantin Brâncuşi carried out a process of reduction of the human figure towards the strictest simplicity, close to abstraction (Sleeping Muse, 1911). Alberto Giacometti followed in his wake, with figures reduced to simple filaments, which he called "transparent constructions", very elongated and emaciated, showing the isolation of man: Standing Nude (1953), Tall Woman (1960). Hans Bellmer practiced a sadomasochistic eroticism, with articulated mannequins in various postures, such as The Doll (1934). Henry Moore was inspired by the human body in many of his works, which feature an abstraction of form in which the body is outlined by simple, dynamic, undulating lines that suggest rather than describe its basic shape. Some of his works, such as Lying Figure (1938) and Reclining Figure (1951), are vaguely reminiscent of Parthenon figures such as Ilyissus and Dionysus, but schematized into elongated, flowing forms with meandering lines that evoke the erosion of the sea on a rock.

Frida Kahlo's otherwise personal and unclassifiable work is related to surrealism, reflecting in her canvases her life tormented by an accident that destroyed her spine and her husband's infidelities. One of her first nudes was Desnudo de Mujer India (1929), in which she already shows her style: fantastic figuration and intense chromatism, with an abundance of anecdotal elements. In Unos cuantos piquetitos (1935) she represented a brutal real murder that had occurred shortly before, committed out of jealousy, where the murderer defended himself by saying "but it was only a few piquetitos!", a scene in which the author projects her pain for her husband's infidelity with her little sister, a fact corroborated by the stab wounds she inflicted on the work as soon as she finished it. In Two Nudes in a Forest (1939) two naked women appear, one with lighter skin and the other with darker skin, reclining one on top of the other, and observed by a monkey, symbol of sin, in a scene that can have two interpretations: the first would be that of lesbian love, while the second would be a double self-portrait of Frida, capturing her two natures, the European and the Mexican. The Broken Column (1944) is a self-portrait that shows the steel corset she had to wear for a while because of the accident that had destroyed her spine, represented by an Ionic column, while her whole body is pierced with nails, in an image of intense drama; in this painting she initially appeared nude, but finally only her breasts were exposed.

Art Deco (1925–1945)

Art Deco (Note: The term art déco is a diminutive of arts décoratifs ("decorative arts" in French), and comes from the 1925 Decorative Arts Exhibition (Exposition Internationale des Arts Décoratifs et Industriels Modernes) in Paris (AA. VV. (1991, p. 59)).) was a movement that emerged in France in the mid-1920s and was a revolution in interior design and the graphic and industrial arts. Aimed mainly at a bourgeois public—that of the so-called Belle Époque—it stood out for ostentation and luxury. It developedd notably in advertising illustration (Erté) and poster design (Cassandre). In painting, the work of Tamara de Lempicka stood out: she trained with the nabí Maurice Denis and the cubist André Lhote, while she felt a great fascination for Ingres, which earned her work the nickname "Ingresian cubism". Later, she had a surrealist phase and then moved towards a certain neoclassicism. Her nudes present women who are a product of their time, elegant and sophisticated, luxurious and glamorous, as if they were out of a fashion magazine, but subjected to the dictates of a macho society, from which they sometimes seem to rebel, becoming modern heroines whose bodies reveal a vibrant inner power. In contrast to the classical dichotomy between the heavenly Venus and the worldly Venus, Lempicka creates a third type of woman, neither divine nor unapproachable, but neither vulgar nor vilifiable, a modern woman who assumes her sexuality without hindrance, and who is admired and respected by men, a woman of high society who follows the dictates of fashion. Among her works stand out: The Two Friends (1923), Perspective (1923), Sleeping Girl (1923), Seated Nude (1923), Rhythm (1924), Nude on a Terrace (1925), The Model (1925), Group of Four Female Nudes (1925), The Dream (1927), Andromeda (1927), The Pink Shirt (1927), The Beautiful Rafaela (1927), Women Bathing (1929), Two Friends (1930), Nude with Buildings (1930), Adam and Eve (1932), Susanna in the Bath (1938), etc.

Spain

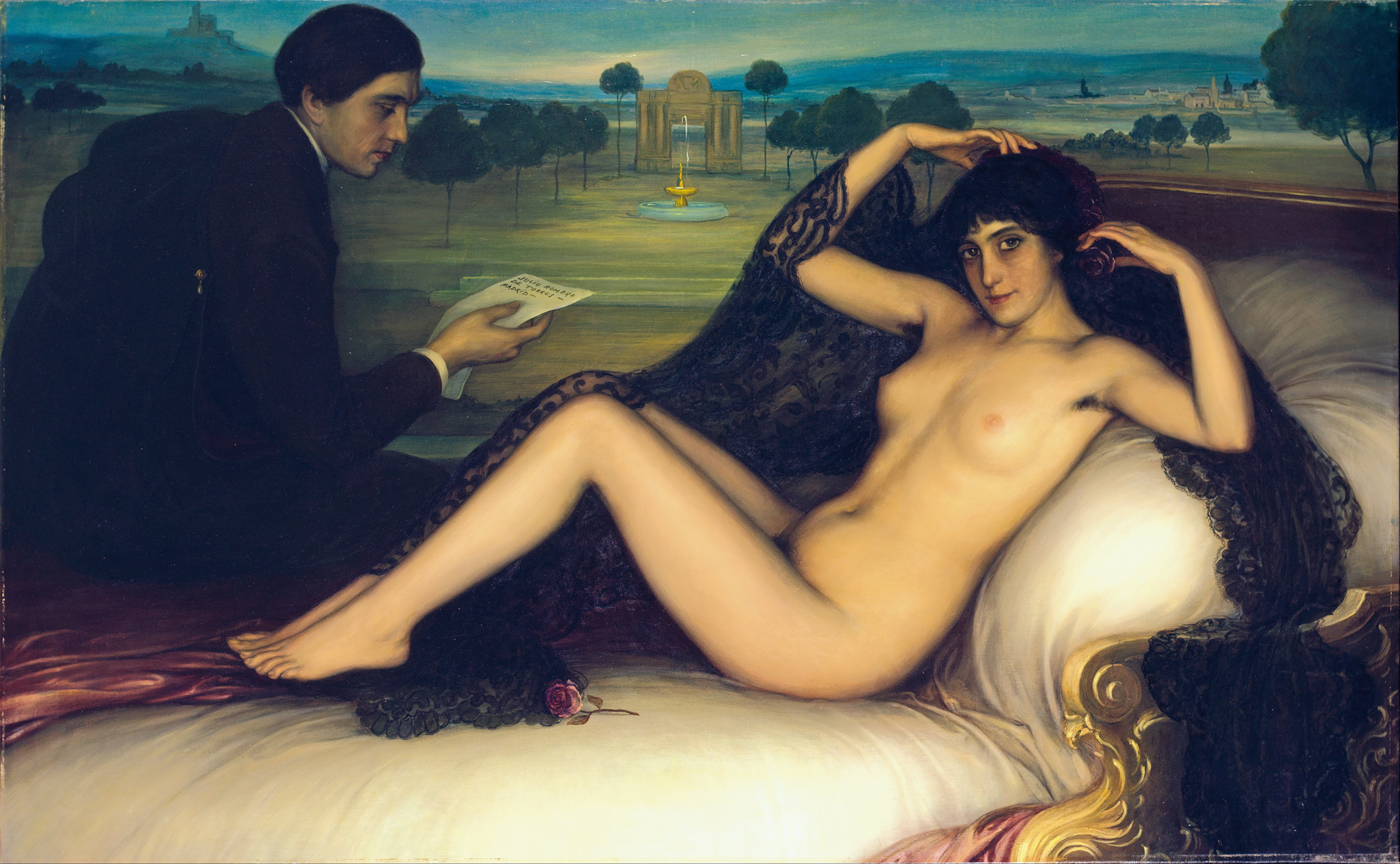
Venus of Poetry (1913), by Julio Romero de Torres, Bilbao Fine Arts Museum.

In Spain, the artistic avant-garde developed more slowly, although many Spanish artists were pioneers of the international avant-garde (Picasso, Dalí, Miró). At the beginning of the century, the Spanish artistic scene was still dominated by academicism, coexisting to a lesser extent with impressionism and modernism (especially in Catalonia), which was replaced in the 1910s by noucentisme, a classicist movement of Mediterranean inspiration. Even so, little by little, the new currents were introduced, especially cubism, expressionism, and surrealism. In this environment, the nude was a much more frequent theme than in all the previous art practiced in the peninsula, and many Spanish artists competed in international competitions with nude works. Thus, for example, Julio Romero de Torres owed much of his fame to his academic nudes, but with a certain Leonardesque influence—in his beginnings he was tempted by pointillism, as in Vividoras del amor (1906), but he soon abandoned it—tinged with a dramatic and sensualist feeling typical of his Cordovan origin, as can be seen in The Gypsy Muse (1908), The Altarpiece of Love (1910), The Sin (1913), Venus of Poetry (1913), The Grace (1915), Rivalry (1925–1926), A Present to the Bullfighting Art (1929), Cante Jondo (1929), Trini's granddaughter (1929), etc. Ignacio Zuloaga was influenced by Toulouse-Lautrec, but his work is nourished by the masters of the Prado, with works in a costumbrist style, including The Italian, the Nude of the Mantilla and the Carnation (1915), and La Oterito (1936). Other outstanding artists are: José Gutiérrez Solana (Las chicas de la Claudia, 1929), Marceliano Santa María (Angélica y Medoro, 1910; Figuras de romance, 1934), Fernando Álvarez de Sotomayor (Orfeo atacado por las bacantes, 1904; El rapto de Europa, 1907; Leda y el cisne, 1918), Francisco Soria Aedo (Pasión, Fauno galante, Fruto de amor, Juventud de Baco), Gabriel Morcillo (Alegoría a Baco, Fantasía morisca), Eduardo Chicharro (Los amores de Armida y Reinaldo, 1904; Las tentaciones de Buda, 1922), Eugenio Hermoso (El baño de las zagalas, 1923; Tierra, Fauna y Flora, 1923; Melancolía, 1926; Madreselvas, 1926), Roberto Fernández Balbuena (Desnudo de espaldas, 1926; Desnudo Pittsburgh, 1926; Desnudos luz sombra, 1929), Néstor Martín-Fernández de la Torre (Adagio, 1903; Calma, Pleamar y Borrasca de la serie Poema del Atlántico, 1918–1924), Juan de Echevarría (La mestiza desnuda, 1923), Francisco Iturrino (Mujeres en el campo, Mujeres en la playa), Hermenegildo Anglada Camarasa (Gitana bajo una parra, 1909), Joaquim Sunyer (Pastoral, 1911; Paisaje con cuatro desnudos, 1915; Desnudo en el campo, 1925), Aurelio Arteta (Bañistas, 1930; Hombres del mar, 1932), Josep Maria Sert (Francisco de Vitoria Room at the Palais des Nations in Geneva), Rafael Zabaleta (Nocturno del desnudo, 1954), etc. In the sculptural field, we could mention: Mariano Benlliure (Maja desnuda, 1902), Enric Clarasó (Eva, 1904), Josep Llimona (Desconsuelo, 1907), Miguel Blay (Eclosión, 1908), Mateo Inurria (Deseo, 1914; Forma, 1920), Josep Clarà (El Crepúsculo, 1907–1910; La Diosa, 1909; Ritmo, 1910; Juventud, 1928), Julio Antonio (Venus Mediterránea, 1914), Victorio Macho (Monument to Santiago Ramón y Cajal, 1926), Pablo Gargallo (Gran bailarina, 1929; El profeta, 1933), etc.

==== Latest trends ====
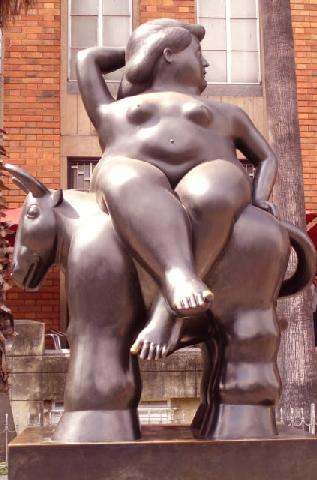
The Rape of Europa (1994), by Fernando Botero, St. Petersburg, Florida.

Since World War II, art has undergone a vertiginous evolutionary dynamic, with styles and movements that have followed each other more and more rapidly over time. The modern project originated with the historical avant-gardes. It culminated in various anti-material styles that emphasized the intellectual origins of art over its material realization, such as action art and conceptual art. Once this level of analytical prospection of art was reached, the inverse effect was produced—as is usual in the history of art, where different styles confront and oppose each other, the rigor of some succeeding the excess of others, and vice versa—returning to the classical forms of art, accepting its material and esthetic component, and renouncing its revolutionary and society-transforming character. This is how postmodern art emerged: the artist shamelessly transitions between different techniques and styles, without a vindictive character, returning to artisanal work as the essence of the artist. Finally, at the end of the century, new techniques and supports appeared in the field of art: video, computing, internet, laser, holography, etc.

Informalism (1945–1960)

Informalism is a group of tendencies that emphasize the artist's expressiveness, renouncing any rational aspect of art (structure, composition, or preconceived application of color). It is an eminently abstract art, although some artists retain figuration, in which the material support of the work becomes relevant and assumes the leading role over any theme or composition. It includes various currents such as tachisme, art brut, matter painting or abstract expressionism in the United States. Informalist artists have experienced first hand the horrors of war, so their work is imbued with pessimism, with a vital despair that translates into aggressive works, where the human figure is mutilated, deformed, crushed, highlighting the fragility and vulnerability of the human being, as seen in the work of artists like Dubuffet, who crushes the figures, opening them up like an ox; Fautrier, who disfigures the human form, reducing it to a formless nudity; or Antonio Saura, who creates monsters in black and white, even of beauties like Brigitte Bardot. These authors seek to destroy the idea of Beauty, Nude, Harmony, all those ideals that academic art treated with capital letters. They distance themselves from Western culture, which has engendered these horrors, returning to primitivism, to the infancy of humanity. To do so, they also use new materials considered dirty, detritic, and unworthy, such as mud, plaster, sacks, etc. Instead of using brushes, they even use their hands to scratch the canvas, emphasizing the gestural effect.

Jean Fautrier made nudes where the figure is deformed, made from different color textures, on paper supports, treated with plaster and glue, on which he applies a raw substance, made with inks and powders, on which he draws or scratches, until he achieves the desired image. Jean Dubuffet began in 1950 his series of Bodies of a Lady—an antinomian title, since it contrasts the materiality of the body with the spirituality of the meaning of "lady", which gives a high dignity to women—made with raw materials, drawing the figure with scratches, and treating the body as a mass that is crushed on the support, as in a butcher's board. Willem de Kooning made female nudes, but distorted to the maximum, with great color. His Women series (1945–1950) is halfway between figuration and abstraction, in which the female figure is reduced to spots of color, applied aggressively and expressively, with contours that evoke prehistoric fertility goddesses as well as obscene street paintings.

Antoni Tàpies is basically an abstract painter, although in his works he sometimes introduces parts of the human body, especially the genitals, in schematic forms, often with the appearance of deterioration; the body appears torn, assaulted, pierced. This can be seen in The inner fire (1953), a human torso in the form of a burlap cloth decomposed by burns; Ochre and pink relief (1965), a kneeling female figure; Matter in the form of an armpit (1968), in which he adds real hair to the figure of a torso showing the armpit; Body (1986) reflects a recumbent figure, evocative of death—which is accentuated by the word "Tartaros", the Greek hell; in Days of Water I (1987) we see a body submerged in waves of gray paint, evoking the legend of Hero and Leander. Other works of his are: Two Figures (1947), Varnish Nude (1980), Torso (1985), Prajna = Dhyana (1993), Man (2002), Black Jersey (2008), etc.

New figuration (1945–1960)

In response to informalist abstraction, a movement arose that recovered figuration, with a certain expressionist influence and a total freedom of composition. Although it was based on figuration, this did not mean it was realistic; it could be deformed or schematized to the artist's taste. The existentialist philosophy and its pessimistic vision of the human being had a decisive influence on the genesis of this style, and it was linked to the beat movement and the angry young men. One of its main exponents was Francis Bacon, an artist with a personal, solitary trajectory, alien to the avant-garde—in the 1930s, when he began to paint, he was rejected for not being a surrealist or abstract artist. In 1944, he destroyed all his previous work. He began his most personal style with Three Studies of Figures at the Base of a Crucifixion, where he used a traditional medium, the triptych, to expose figures whose nudity is deformed, vulnerable, mocked, framed in unreal spaces, which resemble boxes that enclose the figures in an oppressive, anguished atmosphere. His nudes, both male and female, look like lumps of amorphous flesh, writhing and fighting a desperate struggle for existence. They have an oily consistency and a cadaverous pallor, accentuated by the artificial, bulb-like light, resembling butcher's meat rather than human flesh. A great lover of art—he often visited the Museo del Prado—he made versions of many works by Velázquez or Rembrandt. Other works of his are: Study for Crouching Nude (1952), Nude (1960), Reclining Figure (1966), etc.

For Lucian Freud the nude was one of his main themes, which he treated in a realistic, stark, detailed way, without omitting any detail, from veins and muscles to wrinkles and any imperfection of the skin. They are raw, epidermal, expressive, intimate nudes, the human being stripped of any accessory, pure and free as he comes into the world. They are somewhat distressing nudes, as they reflect the vulnerability of mortal flesh, the loneliness of our worldly transit, and they remind us of the perishability of life. His first nudes have an academic tone, still idealized, like his Sleeping Nude (1950), but little by little they become more expressive, with loose brushstrokes and a more intense chromatism, as in MNaked girl laughing (1963), which is one of his daughters. Between the 1960s and 1970s he reaches his definitive style, with figures in intimate, carefree postures, in frames reminiscent of photography, with a linear drawing and marked contours, with an intense light and a strong chromaticism where the carnal tones stand out, arranged in colored spots: Naked girl sleeping (1968), Naked man with a rat (1977–1978), Rose (1979), Seated figure (1980–82), Naked man on a bed (1987), Naked man seen from behind (1992), Two women (1992), And the groom (1993), Painter at work, reflection (1993, self-portrait of the artist nude), Flora with blue toenails (2000–2001), The Painter Surprised by a Naked Admirer (2005).

Balthus was a painter obsessed by a theme, the sexual awakening of young adolescents, which he used to represent in interiors of languid appearance and intense illumination, with a somewhat naive eroticism, but denoting a certain air of perversity: The Guitar Lesson (1934), The Living Room (1941–1943), Girl Sleeping (1943), The Bedroom (1947), The Room (1952), Nude Before the Mirror (1955), Young Woman Preparing for the Bath (1958), Cat in the Mirror (1977–1980), Nude Lying Down (1983), Latent (1995). Ivan Albright was framed in the so-called magical realism, with a meticulously detailed style, portraying with rigorous precision the decadence, corruption and spoils of age, with great emotional intensity (And Man Created God in His Own Image, 1929–1930).

In sculpture, Germaine Richier, who followed in the footsteps of Giacometti in stylized figures with elongated limbs, resembling insects, with a lacerated and tattered appearance, as if in decomposition, giving equal importance to emptiness and matter (Shepherd on the Landes, 1951); and Fernando Botero, author of large figures that resemble swollen dolls (Female Torso (La Gorda), 1987; Woman with Mirror, 1987; The Rape of Europe, 1994).

Pop-art (1955–1970)

It emerged in Great Britain and the United States as a movement to reject abstract expressionism, encompassing a series of authors who returned to figuration, with a marked popular component, drawing on images from advertising, photography, comics, and mass media. Pop-art assumed sex as something natural, unabashedly, within the framework of the sexual liberation of the 1960s advocated by the hippie movement. The first work considered pop art was Richard Hamilton's Just What is It That Makes Today's Homes So Different, so Appealing? (1956), which was the poster for the This is Tomorrow exhibition at the White Chapel Art Gallery in London; it was a photomontage, which exalted consumerism as a modernizing element, where everyday objects become works of art, and where a bodybuilder and a half-naked woman appeared as objects in the scene.

Tom Wesselmann made in the series Great American Nudes (1960s) a set of works where the nude is shown as a consumer product, with an advertising aesthetic and close to Playboy-type erotic magazines, accentuated by the flatness of the works and the simplification of colors with Matissian roots, highlighting the most "objectual" body parts (red lips, white teeth, blond hair, prominent breasts), along with various decorative objects, fruits or flowers. The bodies have a cold, artificial consistency, like inflatable dolls, and usually present the typical white areas left by bikinis in contrast with the rest of the more tanned body. In the series Bathrooms (1963), he moved into three-dimensionality, in which his typical nude paintings appeared with real objects such as curtains, towels, detergents, or nail polish, or were seen through a half-open door, thereby emphasizing the voyeuristic effect. In Still Life (1963), a nude woman appears with a concave ashtray—symbol of the female sex—and a cigarette—phallic symbol—in a somewhat kitsch environment, with pure colors.

Mel Ramos produced works of a more evident eroticism, close to pornography, with female figures that look like Pin-Ups, as in Miss Corn-Flakes (1964) or Philip Morris. Tobacco Rose (1965). Roy Lichtenstein specialized in images similar to those of comics, even highlighting the characteristic stippling of the printing processes. Between 1993 and 1994, he made his series of Nudes: Nude Thinking, Two Nudes, Nude with Blue Hair.

New Realism (1958–1970)

French movement inspired by the world of surrounding reality, consumerism and industrial society, from which they extract—unlike pop-art—its most unpleasant aspects, with a special predilection for harmful materials. One of its main exponents was Yves Klein, a revolutionary artist who was a precursor of conceptual and action art. During his "blue period", when he painted monochromatic paintings in an intense ultramarine blue—which he baptized as International Klein Blue (IKB), a registered trademark—he made several nude sculptures inspired by the classical Venus, but dyed blue, as well as a version of Michelangelo's Dying Slave. He also made several plaster casts of his friends, all nude and painted blue, such as Relief Portrait of Claude Pascal (1962) and Relief Portrait of Arman (1962). In 1958 he began his "anthropometries", where a nude model—which he called his "living brushes"—smeared with paint, lay down on a canvas, leaving the imprint of her body painted on the canvas, in various imprints that varied according to the position of the body, or according to the movement, as he sometimes rotated the models on the canvas. Sometimes, he also made "negative anthropometries", that is, by placing the model in front of the canvas and spraying paint, thus marking her silhouette. These experiences mark the point of origin of body-art, at the same time that they prelude the happenings, because of the staging that Klein conferred to these realizations, often developed in galleries in front of the public, in evenings with music and tasting an aperitif.

Action art (since 1960)

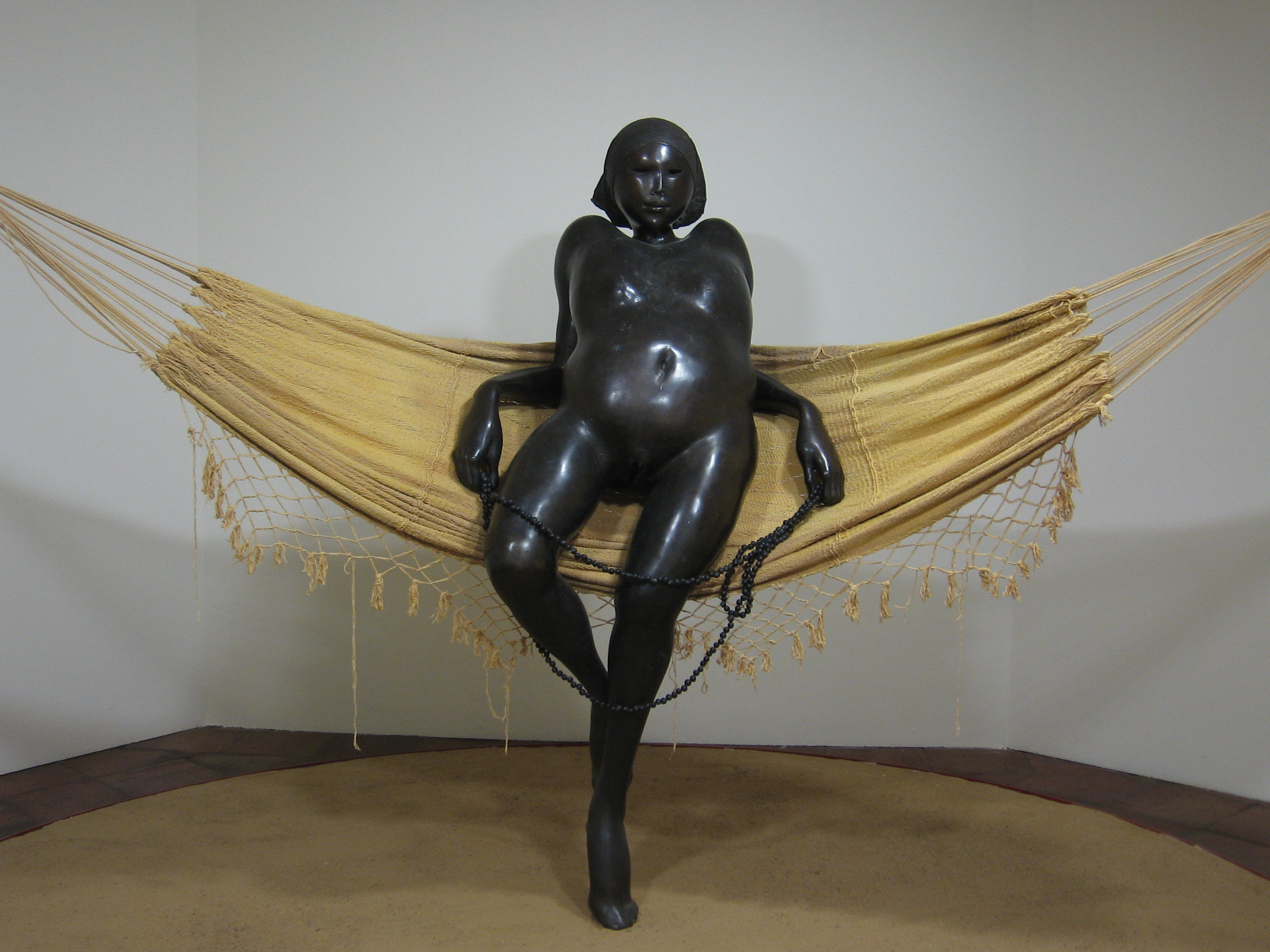
La desconocida (1972), by Cornelis Zitman, in an exhibition at the Casa de los Tiros in Granada.

These are diverse tendencies in artistic creation, where the important thing is not the work itself but the creative process, in which, in addition to the artist, the public often intervenes, with a large component of improvisation. It encompasses various artistic manifestations such as happening, performance, environment, installation, etc. The members of the Gutai group in Japan could be considered pioneers: Katsuō Shiraga performed in Back to the Mud, an action in which he submerged himself naked in the mud, as an idea of death, of the return to the primordial matter. These artists were very marked by the experience of the Second World War. In Europe, the Fluxus group and artists like Wolf Vostell stood out, who made several happenings where he intervened the nude: in Disasters (Vagina cement formwork) (1972) he immobilized a train carriage and a naked woman with reinforced concrete for 24 hours; in Fandango (1975) he made a "concert for two violins, operator and model": while he played the violin, the operator with a mountain chain cut car doors, and the naked model listened with her eyes covered. Vostell's actions had a strong political component, denouncing social injustice, the destruction of nature, the arms race, discrimination against women, and other similar causes.

Hyperrealism (from 1965)

As a reaction to the minimalism in vogue in the 1950s and 1960s, this new figurative current emerged, characterized by a superlative, exaggerated vision of reality, captured with great accuracy in all its details, with an almost photographic aspect. John Kacere paints fragments of female bodies, especially sexes and buttocks with tight panties. In sculpture, John De Andrea makes nudes with a strong sexual charge (The Artist and his Model, 1976). In Spain, Antonio López García is the author of academic works, but where the most meticulous description of reality is combined with a vague, unreal aspect close to magical realism. Some of his nudes are: Woman in the bathtub (1968), a work of photographic effect, a woman takes a bath in an environment of electric light that is reflected in the bathroom tiles, creating an intense and vibrant composition; Man and woman (1968–1990), a work on which he worked more than twenty years and left unfinished, aims to create common prototypes of man and woman, for which he took multiple notes of various models, synthesized in a standard forms that could correspond to any person in the street.

Conceptual art (1965–1980)

After the material stripping of minimalism, conceptual art renounced the material substratum to focus on the mental process of artistic creation, affirming that art is in the idea, not in the object. It includes several tendencies, such as linguistic conceptual art, Arte Povera, body-art, land-art, bio-art, etc. Various genres of social vindication, such as feminist art and homoerotic art, could also be included in this trend. In relation to the nude, of special relevance is body-art, a movement that emerged in the late 1960s and developed in the 1970s, which touched on various themes related to the body, especially in relation to violence, sex, exhibitionism or bodily resistance to certain physical phenomena. Two lines are evident in this movement: the American, more analytical, where the action is more valued, the vital, instantaneous component, valuing more the perception and the relationship with the viewer, and documented with Videos; and the European, more dramatic, which tends more to treat the body objectually and touch on issues such as transvestism, tattooing or pain, documenting the results through photographs, notes or drawings.

One of its greatest exponents, Dennis Oppenheim, experimented with tanning, leaving parts of the body white. Stuart Brisley made spots on his body to imitate blood. The Viennese Actionism group (Günther Brus, Otto Mühl, Hermann Nitsch and Rudolf Schwarzkogler) performed self-mutilations, incising their own bodies. Youri Messen-Jaschin focused on body painting, integrally covering naked bodies with psychedelic and biological colors. Urs Lüthi uses various media (photography, painting, sculpture, video), exploring his own body in kitsch self-portraits, with a strong ironic charge, which constitute a reflection on the body, time, and life, as well as the relationship with others. In 2001, he presented two installations at the Venice Biennale that are among his best-known works (Run for your life and Placebos and surrogates), in which the central theme is the excessive cult of the body.

Feminist art has sought to vindicate the image of woman as a person rather than an object, focusing on her essence, both material and spiritual, and highlighting aspects of her sexual condition, such as menstruation, motherhood, etc. An essential aspect is the message, the attempt to make the viewer reflect, if necessary, through provocation, with shocking works that stir the conscience. One of the ways of diluting gender differences has been through the degradation or mutilation of the body: thus, Donna Haraway creates neutral, transhuman bodies, which she calls "cyborg bodies". Cindy Sherman makes deliberately ugly, repulsive female nudes to demystify gender. Judy Chicago defends the value of women as more than just beautiful bodies, in works such as Red Flag (1971). Zoe Leonard shows the body in its crudest reality, as in her series Vagina (1990), inspired by Courbet's The Origin of the World. Kiki Smith makes fragile sculptures of fragmented bodies, highlighting the processes of reproduction, with scatological elements.

In the 1970s, the organization Women Against Rape criticized—among other aspects of Western culture—the female nude in painting, considering that the representation of the naked female body is a form of rape. In the 1980s, the Guerrilla Girls group launched a campaign under the slogan "Do women have to be naked to enter the Metropolitan Museum?", highlighting the fact that less than 5% of the contemporary artists in this museum are women, but 85% of the nudes are female.

One of the most successful artists in recent times has been Jenny Saville, who creates large works with figures seen from unusual perspectives, where the bodies resemble mountains of flesh that seem to fill the entire space, with a predilection for showing the genital areas, or imperfections and wounds of the skin, with bright, intense colors, arranged by spots, predominantly red and brown tones. They are generally obese bodies—she frequently portrays herself—where the flesh forms folds and wrinkles, with monumental forms that resemble the vision that a child has of an adult. Inspired by Courbet and Velázquez, she paints the real woman of today, without any idealization, without looking for beauty, only truthfulness, creating—as she calls herself—"landscapes of the body".

Postmodern art (since 1975)

As opposed to the so-called modern art, it is the art proper to postmodernity. Postmodern artists assume the failure of the avant-garde movements as the failure of the modern project: the avant-garde intended to eliminate the distance between art and life, to universalize art; the postmodern artist, on the other hand, is self-referential, art speaks of art, and does not intend to do social work. Among the various postmodern movements, the Italian transavantgarde and German neo-expressionism stand out, as well as neo-mannerism, free figuration, etc.

In Italy, Sandro Chia creates an autobiographical work that portrays moments of his own existence, along with references to the history of art, especially the artists he is most interested in, such as Cézanne, Picasso, and Chagall. In The Slave (1980) he made a symbiosis of Michelangelo's Dying Slave and Botticelli's The Birth of Venus, as a way of demystifying art.

In Germany, Markus Lüpertz creates highly expressive works that emphasize the grandeur of his formats and the fascinating colors that permeate his paintings. Thematically, he usually starts from figurative themes to derive them towards abstraction, gathering diverse influences from the art of the past; in particular, he is often inspired by the landscape and the human body, which he reinterprets in a personal and spontaneous way: St. Francis prevents the extermination of rats (1987). Georg Baselitz is characterized by his images of inverted figures and objects, with rotund, heavy forms, inspired by Rubens: Bedroom (Elke and Georg) (1975) and Male Nude (1975). Rainer Fetting uses bodily elements to reproduce his vision of reality, using bright colors, with an acid aspect and Vangoghian influence: 2 Figures (1981).

In the United States, David Salle has been ascribed to various American postmodern trends, such as simulationism or Bad Painting. One of his first works, in a pornographic magazine, was one of his most recurrent sources of inspiration: eroticism, images of naked women treated realistically, without modesty. The main characteristic of Salle's style is the juxtaposition of images, a disorganized and incoherent superposition of images coming from art history, design, advertising, media, comics, popular culture, etc. Some of his works are: Zeitgeist Painting Nr. 4 (1982), King Kong (1983), The Miller's Tale (1984). Eric Fischl cultivates a realistic style inspired by the American pictorial tradition (Winslow Homer, Edward Hopper), portraying naked women who seem to refer to the figure of the mother, in disturbing images enhanced by the intense chromatic ranges: The Old Man's Dog and the Old Man's Boat (1982).

In Spain, Miquel Barceló evokes the heritage of the past, from the Spanish baroque to Goya, in his work, interpreted in a free and personal way, with a certain primitivist air derived from his stays in Mali: Venus bruta (1980).

== Non-Western Art ==
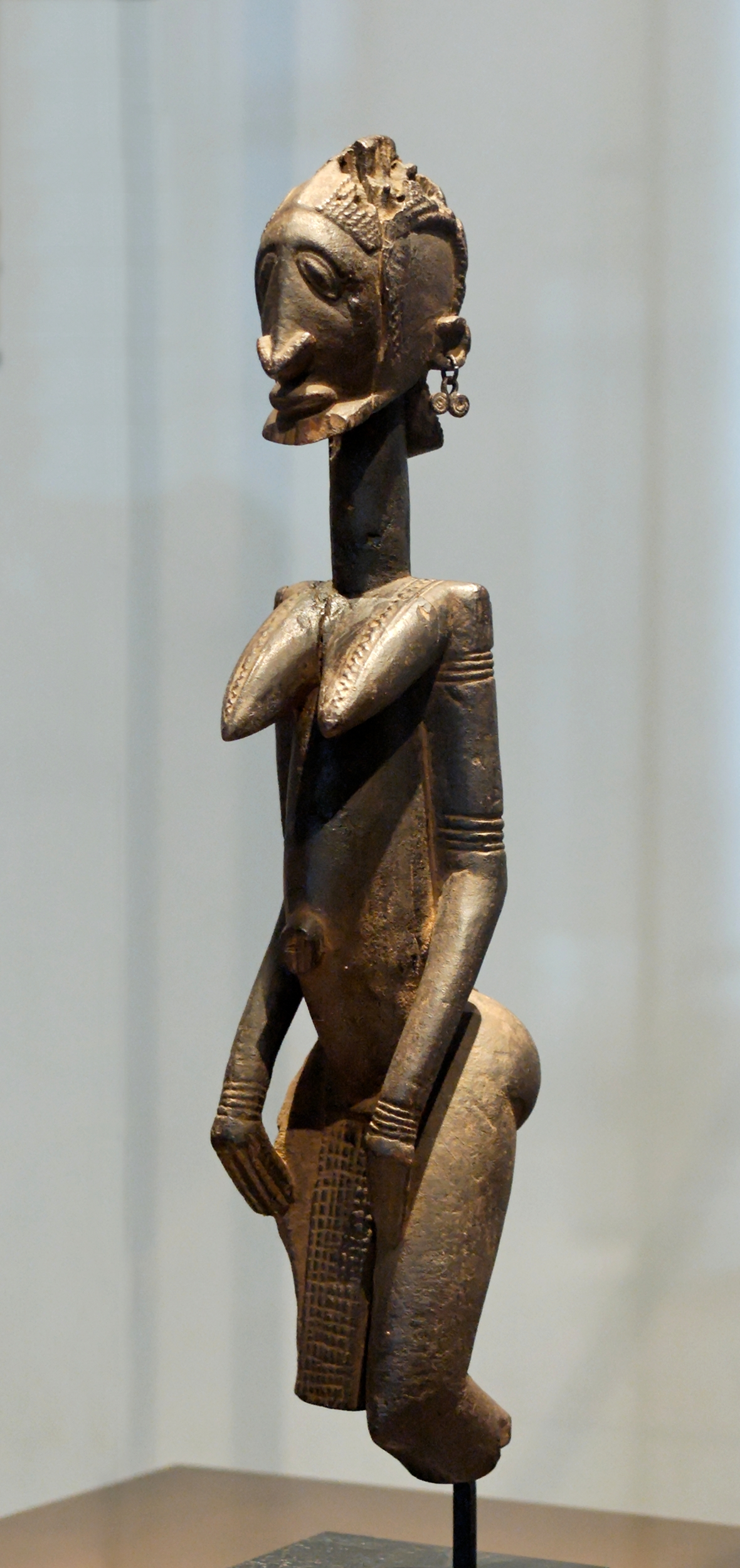
Dogon sculpture, Mali, 17th-18th centuries.

The nude has had a special significance in Western art, and has been a frequent theme in art since Ancient Greece. However, not in all cultures has it had the same significance, and its importance has varied by region, from the practical nullity of its representation to its occurrence with even greater intensity than in the West, as in the case of India. The social consideration of nudity varies according to the geographical area, generally in accordance with the religious concepts of that area, and just as in some places it is contemplated naturally and without inhibitions, in others it is something forbidden and a source of shame. In China, for example, sexuality is considered a private sphere, so that the nude is rare in Chinese art except in art created for sex education or stimulation, or for medical consultations, such as chungongtu.

In pre-Columbian art, the nude is also practically nonexistent, despite the frequent social nudity of the peoples of the area. In Islamic culture not only the naked body, but also clothing is the object of rejection, since according to Islam the works of art are intrinsically defective in comparison with the work of God, so it is believed that trying to describe realistically any animal or person is insolence to God. Even so, in reality human or animal depiction is not totally forbidden in Islamic art: in fact, the image can be found in all Islamic cultures, with varying degrees of acceptance by religious authorities; it is only human depiction for worship that is uniformly considered idolatry and forbidden in sharia law.

=== Africa ===
In African art, sexuality tends to be ritualized and is generally related to the cult of fertility. African art has always had a marked magical-religious character, intended more for rites and ceremonies of the various African animist and polytheistic beliefs than for aesthetic purposes. Most of his works are made of wood, stone, or ivory, in masks and free-standing figures of a more or less anthropomorphic character, with a typical canon of large head, straight trunk, and short limbs. African art had a powerful influence on the European artistic avant-garde of the early 20th century, due to colonialism and the opening of numerous museums of ethnology in most European cities. In particular, young European artists were very interested in the geometric stylization of African sculpture, its expressive character, and its primitive, original, spontaneous, subjective air, the product of a strong interrelation between nature and the human being.

=== India ===
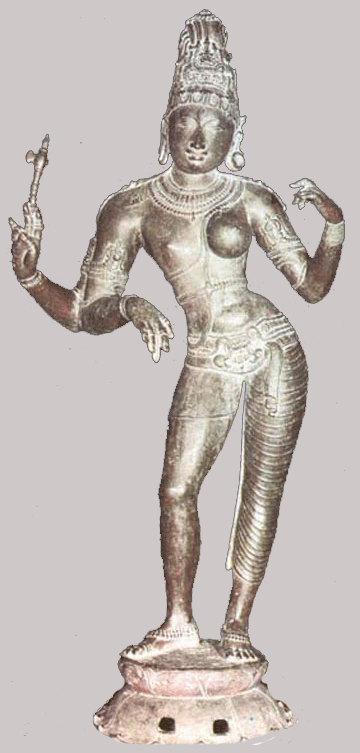
Chola dynasty bronze: the god Śiva in the form of Ardhanarīśvara (half Śiva, half Pārvatī, his wife).

Indian art has a mainly religious character, serving as a vehicle for the transmission of the different religions that have marked India: Hinduism, Buddhism, Islam, Christianity, etc. It should also be noted as a distinctive feature of Indian art its desire to integrate with nature, as an adaptation to the universal order, taking into account that most natural elements (mountains, rivers, trees) have a sacred character for the Indians.

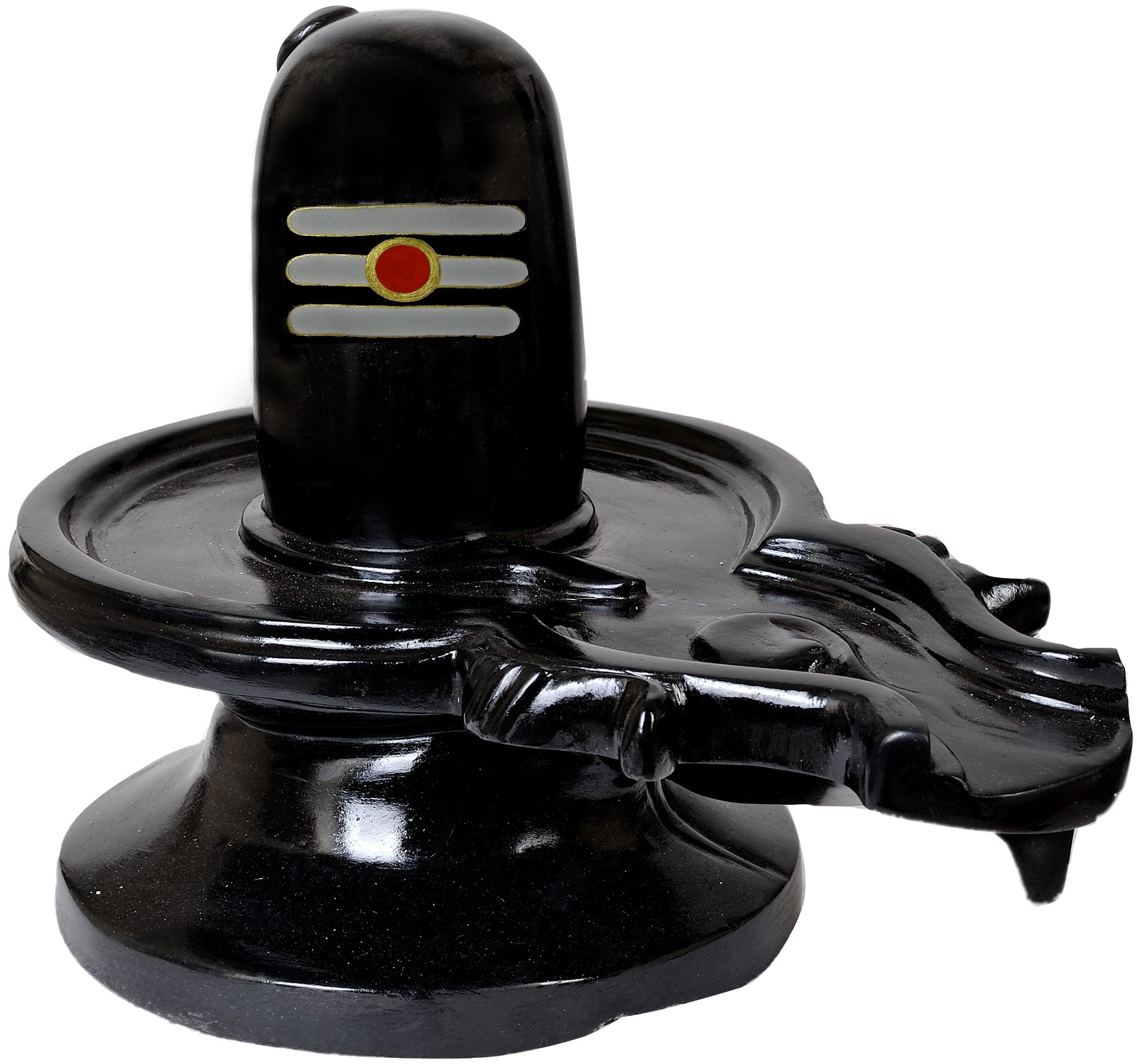
A Shiva lingam, projected on a yoni base

One of the most surprising facets of Indian art for Westerners is the unabashed representation of eroticism: according to the Hindu religion, sex is a form of prayer, a channel between the human and the divine, a sign of transcendence and spirituality. A good example of this is the cult of the liṅgam (male sex symbol) and the yoni (female sex symbol), both deriving from ancient Neolithic fertility rites and taken over by Hinduism. The liṅgam represents the creative power of the god Śiva, and is the main object of veneration in the chapels of the temples dedicated to this god. It is usually represented by a pillar (stambha) ending in the form of a glans (mani), although it can vary from the most naturalistic form to an abstract form consisting of a cylinder, or various manifestations such as a phallus with eyes (ambaka-liṅgam), with a face (ekamukha-liṅgam) or four faces (chatur-mukha-liṅgam). For its part, the yoni represents Śakti (the Mother goddess), as well as Pārvatī (goddess of nature and fertility), wife of Śiva. It can also be represented in naturalistic form as a vagina, or geometrized in the form of a triangle. The liṅgam often appears next to the yoni, forming a concave-shaped vessel from which the liṅgam protrudes. This symbol expresses the unity within the duality of the universe, the creative energy, as well as the transmutation of the sexual impulse into mental energy, the ascension from the world of the senses to spiritual transcendence, achieved through yoga meditation. These ancient rites merged with tantra, a philosophy that seeks truth in the energy emanating from the body, which is a spiritual enhancer, as even sexual energy (kuṇḍalinī). Along with the tales of the Kāma Sūtra ("Book of Love"), these cults had a great representation in Indian art, especially in sculpture, where mithuna or erotic scenes abound, as in the temples of Khajurāho and Koṇārak.

The first great Indian civilization, of Neolithic sign, occurred around 2500–1500 BC in the Indus River area, around the cities of Mohenjo-Dāro (present-day Pakistan) and Harappa (Punjab). Various terracotta figures have been found representing chariots, animals, and human figures, some of them naked and with sexual symbols (the male liṅgam and the female yoni), related to the cult of fertility. There have also been found bronze pieces such as The Dancing Girl of Mohenjo-Dāro, with rounded anatomical forms, highlighting the work both before and after, offering a global image of the figure.

Between the 3rd and 1st centuries BC the maurya art developed, where the first Indian iconographic typologies emerged with the representation of the yakṣīs (nature spirits), generally in the form of nude women adorned with jewels, as can be seen in the east door of the stūpa of Sānchī. These figures were usually depicted in tribhaṅga ("triple bending"), a pose with a sinuous movement that forms three curves, a pose typical of Indian sculpture ever since. This type of representation initiated the genre of erotic art in India, with a curious synthesis of sensuality and spirituality.

In Gupta art (4th–8th centuries) sculpture was characterized by the smoothness of the lines, the perfection of the faces, which denote an ideal beauty, but of a somewhat mystical tone, and a slight tribhaṅga-like movement, as glimpsed in the Torso of bodhisattva from Sānchī (5th century), which together with the smoothness of the skin manifests a great precision in the jewelry and clothing.

The 8th-13th centuries were the golden age of Hindu art, with great profusion of erotic sculpture in temples such as Sūrya in Koṇārak (1240–1258) and the set of Khajurāho (Madhya Pradesh, 10th-11th centuries), which are the most profusely represented scenes of tantric eroticism, with various groups (mithunas) arranged in friezes (kāma-bandha) developing various erotic postures. This type of erotic sculpture was also developed outside India, as in Angkor Wat (Cambodia), where most of the walls of the temple are decorated with friezes in bas-relief where the abundance of female figures stands out, among devatas (or Hindu female goddesses), of which 1500 are counted throughout the temple, and apsaras (or celestial dancers), counting about 2000.

The nude also has a special significance in Jainism, where its two main sects differ precisely in that some are dressed (shvetambara) and others naked (digambara), since they consider that clothes imprison the soul. Thus, their art naturally reflects this fact, with the common representation of naked monks and ascetics, as the statue of Gomateśvara (978–993), an imposing figure of 17 meters high representing the great Jain master Bahubali.

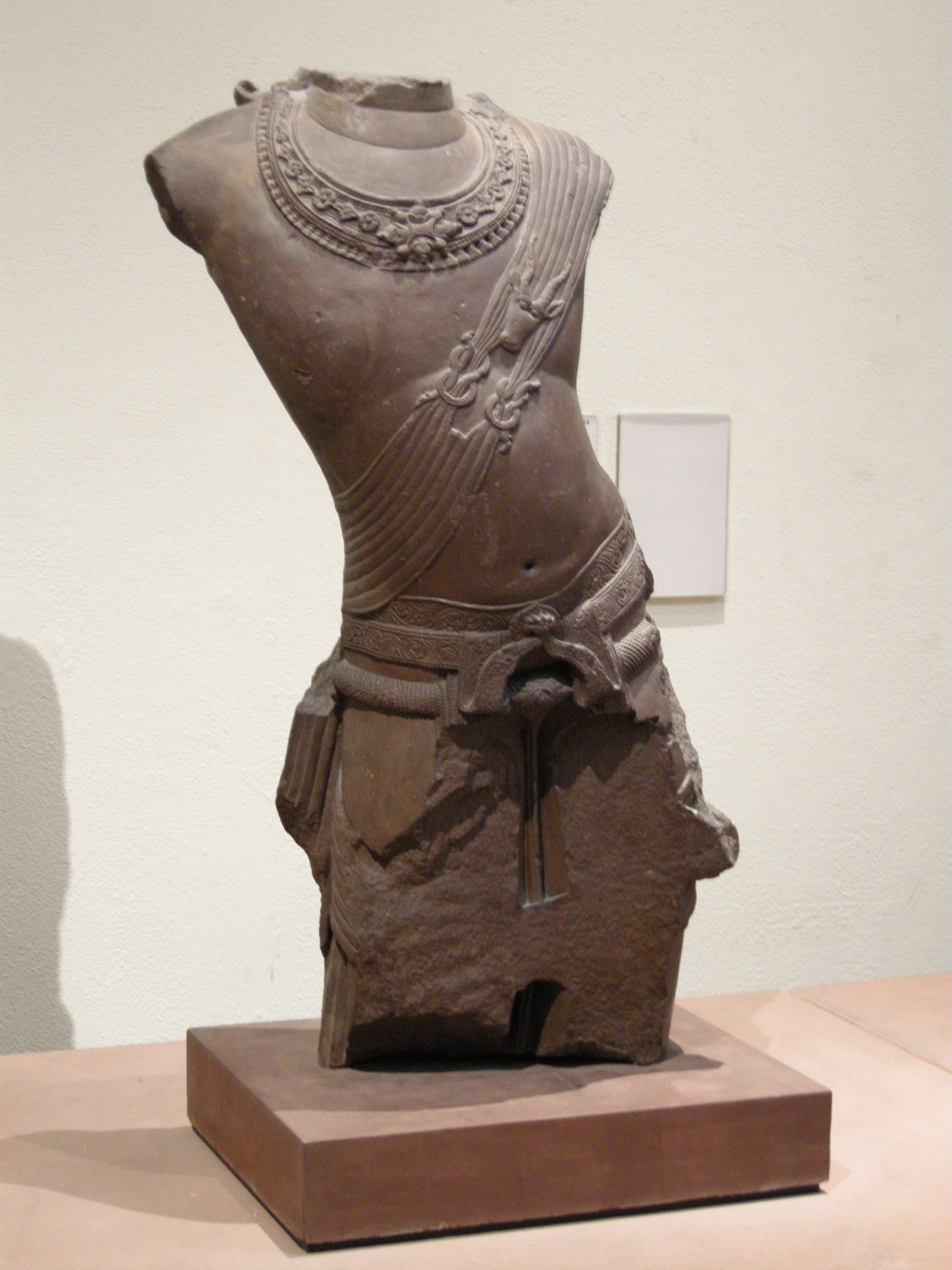
Bodhisattva torso from Sānchī (5th century).

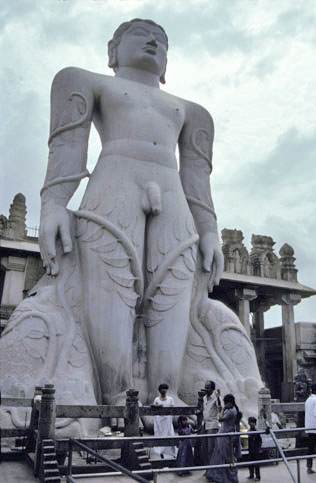
Statue of Gomateśvara (978–993), Shravanbelagola, Karnataka.

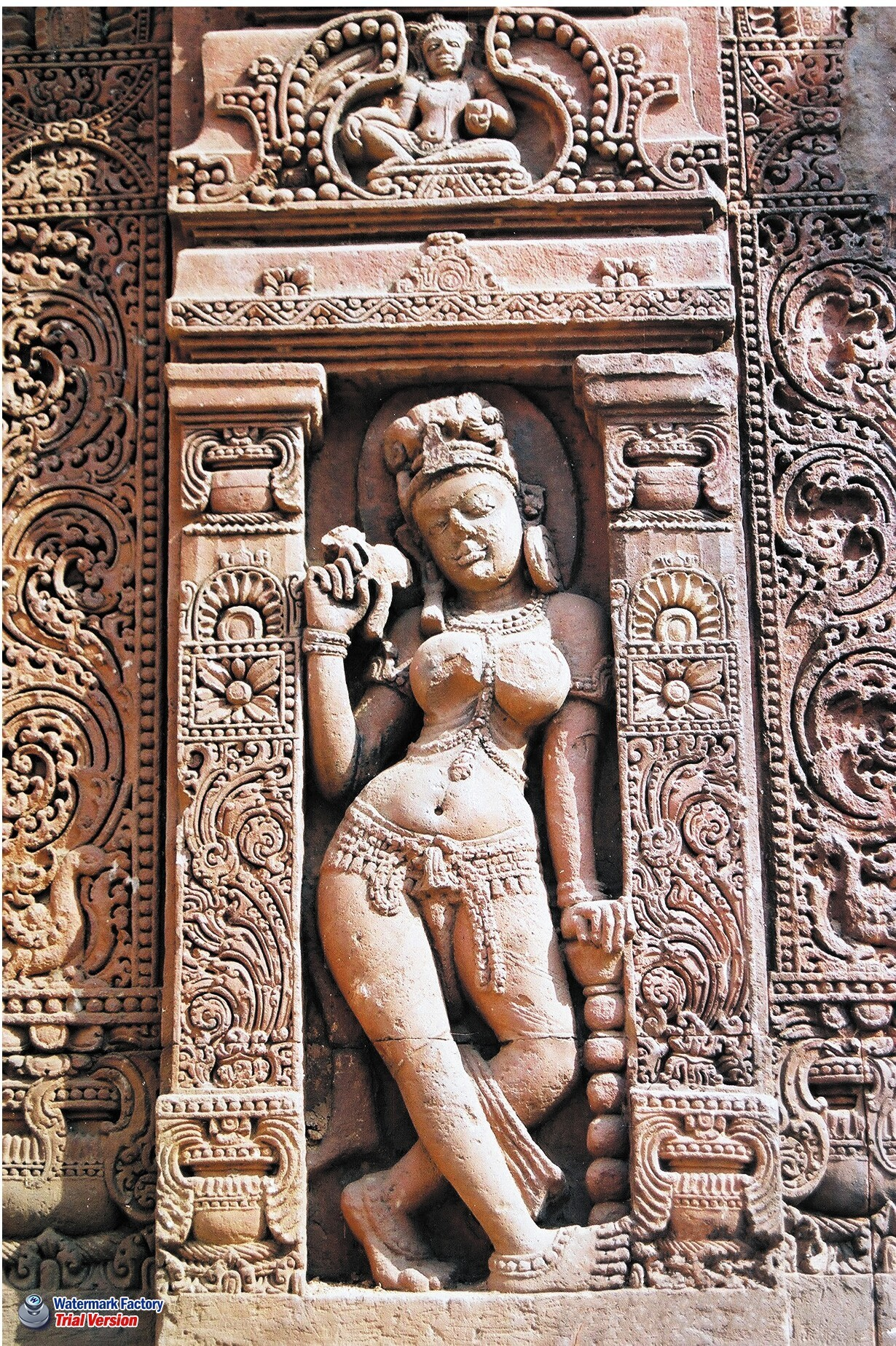
Yakṣī figure from the Liṅgarāja temple at Bhubaneśvara.

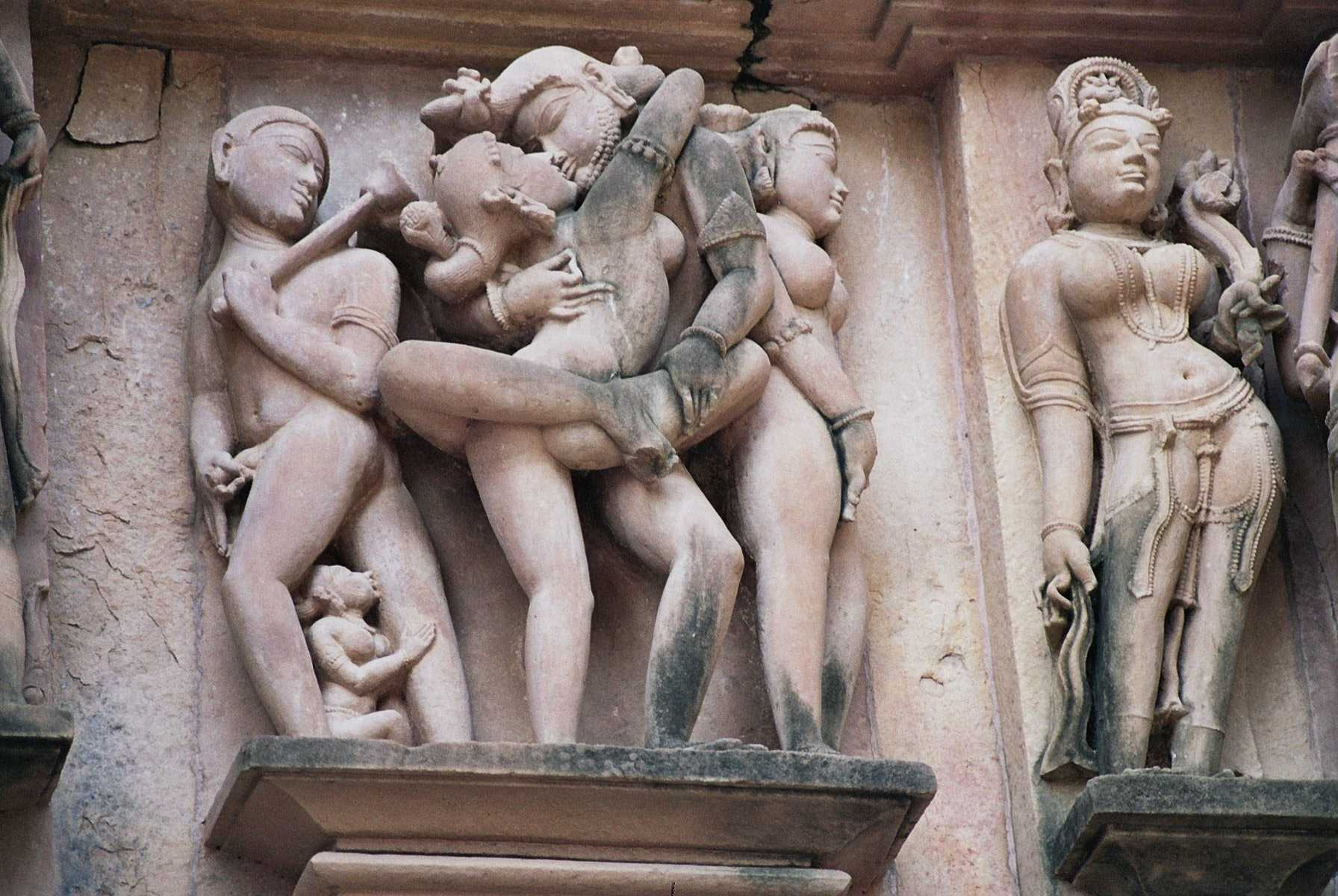
Mithuna or erotic scene from the temple of Khajurāho.

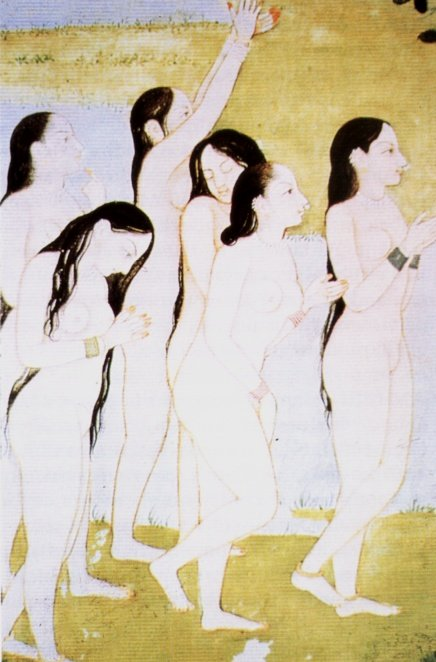
Shepherdesses coming out of the water (18th century), Pahari miniature from the Rajput principality of Kangra (Himachal Pradesh).

=== Japan ===
Onna yu (women's bath) (c. 1780–1790), by Torii Kiyonaga.

Japanese art has been marked by its insularity, although at intervals it has been influenced by continental civilizations, especially China and Korea. In Japanese culture, art has a strong sense of introspection and interrelation between man and nature, also reflected in the objects that surround him, from the most ornate and emphatic to the simplest and everyday. This is evident in the value placed on imperfection, on the ephemeral nature of things, and on the emotional sense that the Japanese establishes with his environment. In Japan, art seeks to achieve universal harmony, going beyond matter to find the life-generating principle. Japanese aesthetics seeks to find the meaning of life through art: beauty is equivalent to harmony and creativity; it is a poetic impulse, a sensory path that leads to the realization of the work, which has no purpose in itself but goes beyond.

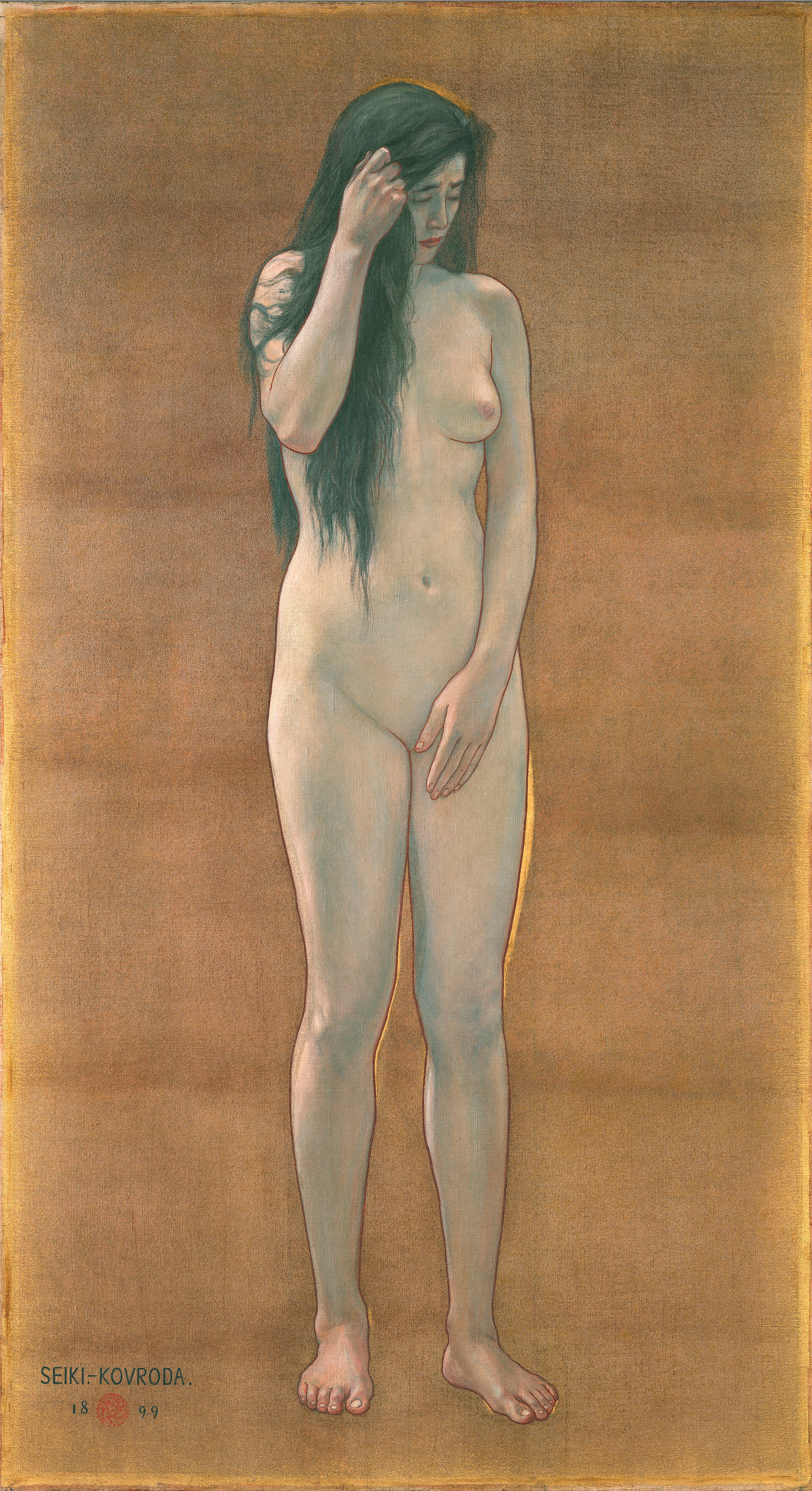
Sentiment (1900), by Kuroda Seiki, Kuroda Memorial Hall, Tokyo.

The nude in Japanese art was not widely represented in official media, even though it was seen as something natural; everything related to sexuality was considered to be related to private life. Even if a nude body could appear in a Japanese image, it would be in the context of an intimate, everyday scene, such as a public bath, but the human body itself was not considered worthy of representation for a work of art. There was, however, an artistic genre devoted especially to erotic images, called shunga (春画, "spring prints"), generally linked to Japanese ukiyo-e prints (浮世絵, "prints of the floating world"), although it also occurred with other typologies. These images were mainly in vogue during the Edo period (1603–1867), usually in woodcut format, being practiced by some of the best artists of the time, such as Hishikawa Moronobu, Isoda Koryūsai, Kitagawa Utamaro, Keisai Eisen, Torii Kiyonaga, Suzuki Harunobu, Katsushika Hokusai and Utagawa Hiroshige. The scenes depicted sexual relations of all kinds, featuring a wide range of characters, from actors and merchants to samurai, Buddhist monks, and even fantastic and mythological beings. Although their production was subject to government regulations and prohibitions, the production of this type of work continued until the end of the Meiji era, with the prohibition of "obscene" material in the Civil Code of 1907. After the opening of Japan to the West in the mid-19th century, Japanese art contributed to the development of the movement known as Japonisme, and several European artists collected shunga, including Aubrey Beardsley, Edgar Degas, Henri de Toulouse-Lautrec, Gustav Klimt, Auguste Rodin, Vincent van Gogh and Pablo Picasso. Shunga is often considered an antecedent of hentai, the erotic side of manga comics.

=== Ethnographic nude ===
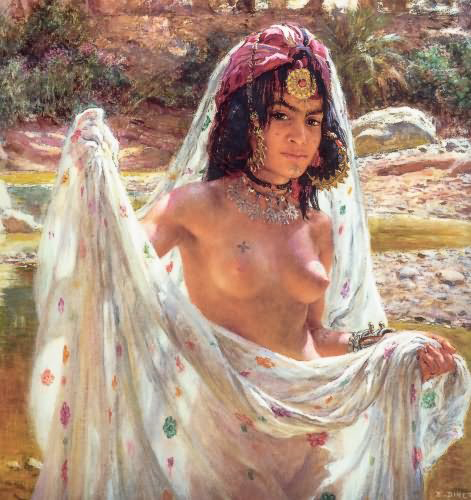
Raoucha (1901), by Étienne Dinet, Musée des Beaux Arts d'Alger, Algiers.

This term has been used in both ethnography and anthropology research, as well as in documentaries and in the United States in National Geographic magazine. In some cases, the media may show nudity in a "natural" or spontaneous setting in documentaries or news programs, while blurring or censoring nudity in theatrical works. The ethnographic focus provided an exceptional framework for painters and photographers to show people whose nudity was, or still is, acceptable within the conventions, or within certain specific framings, of their traditional culture.

Detractors of the ethnographic nude often dismiss it as merely a colonialist gaze preserved as ethnographic imagery. Yet the ethnographic works of some painters and photographers, such as Irving Penn, Casimir Zagourski, Hugo Bernatzik and Leni Riefenstahl, have been acclaimed worldwide for preserving what is perceived as a document of the dying customs of "paradises" subject to the onslaught of mediocre modernity.

== See also ==
- Nude (art)
- History of art
- History of aesthetics
- History of erotic depictions
- Feminist art
- Model (art)
- History of nudity
- Depictions of Nudity
- Nudity
- Scandals in art
