= Farnese Collection =

Various Greek and Roman artworks acquired by the future Pope Paul III

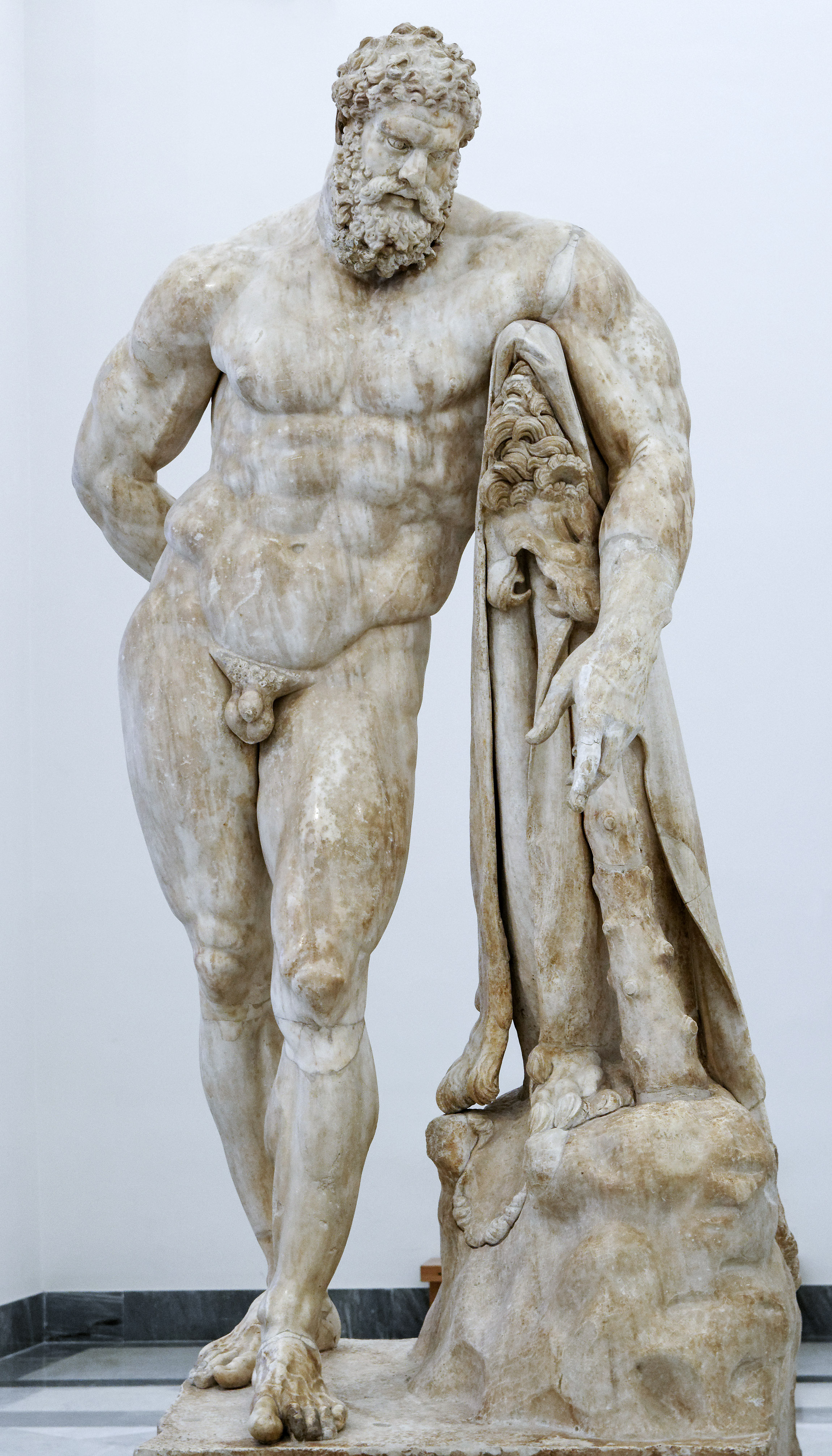
The Farnese Hercules at the Naples National Archaeological Museum

The Farnese Collection is one of the first collections of artistic items from Greco-Roman antiquity. It includes some of the most influential classical works, including the sculptures that were part of the Farnese Marbles, their collection of statuary, which includes world-famous works like the Farnese Hercules, Farnese Cup, Farnese Bull and the Farnese Atlas. These statues are now displayed in the National Archaeological Museum of Naples in Italy with some in the British Museum in London. The items in the collection were acquired or requisitioned by Cardinal Alessandro Farnese, who became Pope Paul III (1534–1549).

== History ==
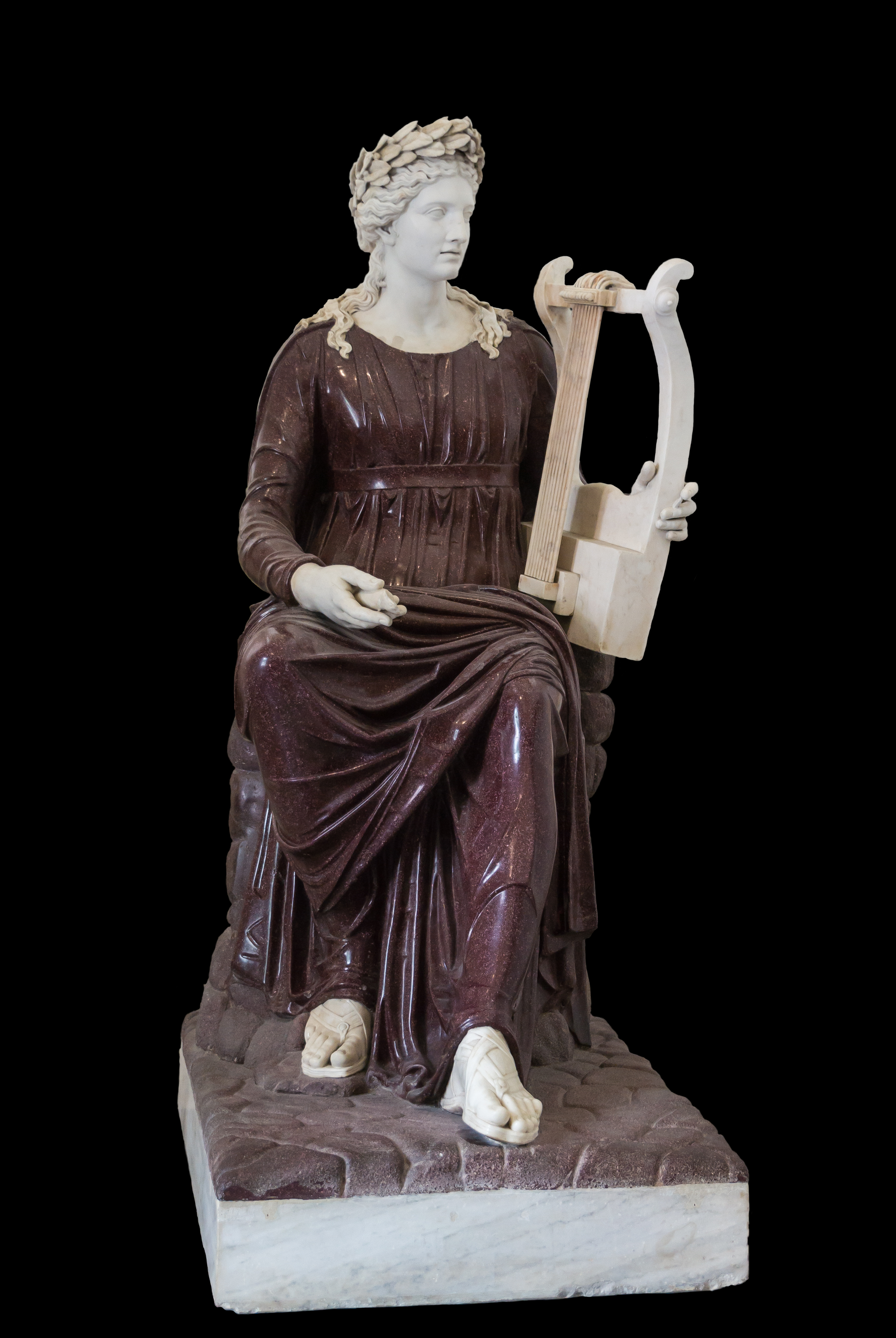
Apollo seated with lyre. Porphyry and marble, 2nd century AD. Farnese collection, National Archaeological Museum, Naples

Classical artworks were routinely uncovered in Roman lands, and during the Italian Renaissance had become much desired. Many were family heirlooms of prominent families in Rome. Alessandro Farnese purchased the Sassi and Bernardino Fabio collections, confiscated the Colonna collection, and received the collection of Cardinal Federico Cesi as a donation. Other works were bought in the antiques market, including works that were appearing as part of excavations and construction throughout the city. Michelangelo had designed internal niches to display statuary in the massive Palazzo Farnese (1546) in Rome.

Many of the most famous works in the Farnese collection, such as the Farnese Hercules and the Farnese Bull, Flora, Gladiator, Athena, and others were all found at the Baths of Caracalla.

The Farnese collection was further enlarged by the Pope's nephew, another Cardinal Alessandro, by the purchase of the Del Bufalo and Cesarini collections. It also included the inheritance left in 1587 by Margaret of Parma, the widow first of Alessandro de Medici and then of Ottavio Farnese. She also possessed a collection of famous engraved gems, which formerly belonged to Lorenzo de' Medici, including the Farnese Cup, and important marble sculptures such as the Pergamene statues.

The Farnese's trusted collector and antiquarian Fulvio Orsini aided in shopping for other works and on his death, left his collection of gems, coins and busts to Odoardo Farnese. Among the works were two statues of Hercules and two statues of Flora; the two Gladiators were placed beneath the arches of the courtyard of the Palazzo; while the Farnese Bull was placed in a special enclosure in the second courtyard.

== Display ==
Inside ancient statues were arranged according to themes within the Farnese Palace. In the Gran Salone, the Sala degli Imperatori, the Sala dei Filosofi and the Galleria dei Carracci were valuable marbles. The Annibale Carracci ceiling frescoes depicting The Loves of the Gods were painted not only to celebrate a wedding, but also commented on statuary in the niches below the frescoes.

== Move to Naples ==
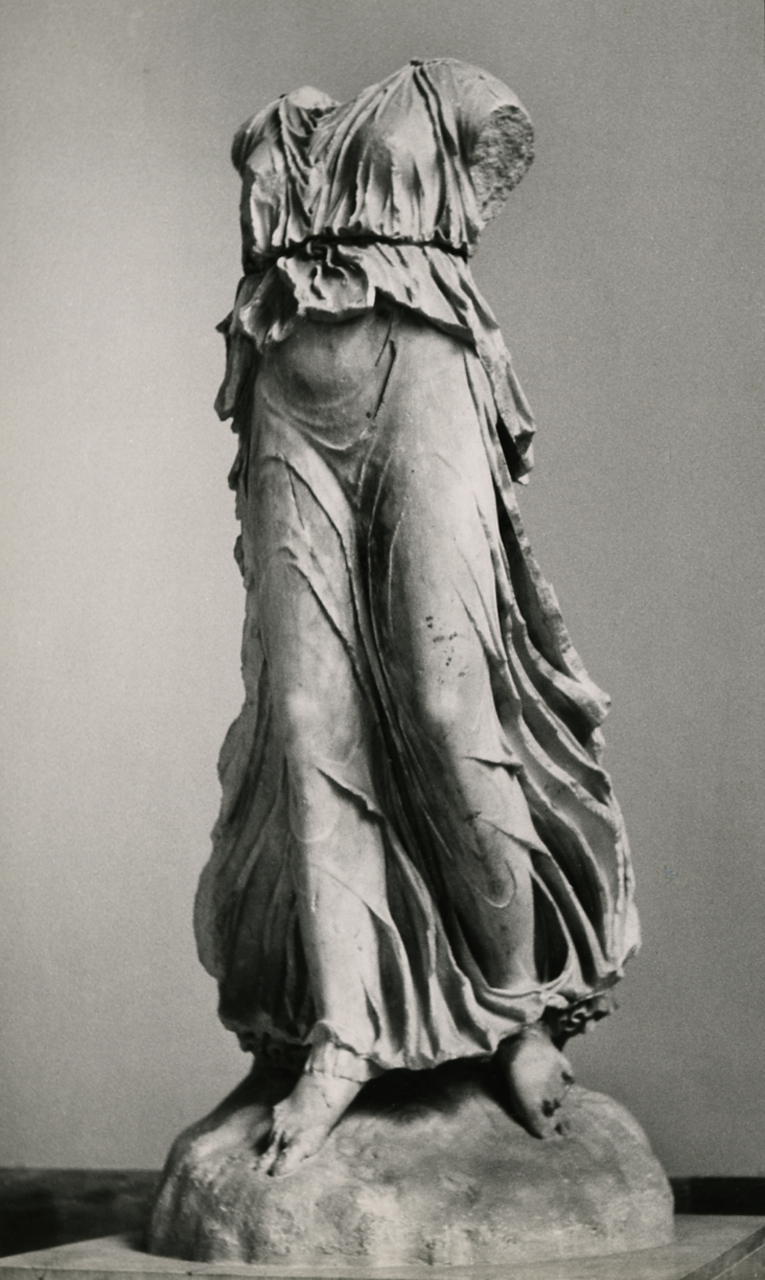
Nike, 2nd-3rd century, in the Naples National Archeological Museum. Photo by Paolo Monti, 1969

The Farnese family, who had become Dukes of Parma lost its last male heir upon the death of Antonio Farnese of Parma, and thus the collection passed through Elisabeth Farnese, who married King Philip V of Spain, to their son Charles of Bourbon, who became King of Naples and Sicily in 1734. He then decided to move the Parmesan collections to Naples. His son Ferdinand IV of Naples brought the Roman collections to Naples in 1787, despite the strong opposition of the Papacy. Many of the marble sculptures were restored by Carlo Albacini (1735–1813).

The classical sculptures of the Farnese collections are still exhibited together at the National Archaeological Museum of Naples. Most of the paintings, on the other hand, have been moved to the Museo di Capodimonte, also in Naples, with some other works from the collections moved to the Pinacoteca of the Palazzo Farnese and Collegio Alberoni of Piacenza, the Galleria nazionale di Parma, and the British Museum.

== Description ==
A large part of the Farnese collection is now on display in Naples, in three distinct complexes: the Archaeological Museum, the Capodimonte Museum, and the Royal Palace. Other works are instead exhibited at the Royal Palace of Caserta, the Civic Museum and the Alberoni College in Piacenza, the National Gallery in Parma, the Art Gallery of Bologna, the British Museum in London, the National Gallery of Art in Washington, and in other museums around the world.

The collection of the Archaeological Museum is mainly made up of Roman sculptures that were long housed in the Farnese Palace in Rome, in the Villa Farnesina, and in the Farnese Gardens on the Palatine Hill.

The Capodimonte collection, on the other hand, consists of paintings from the Emilian and Roman Renaissance and Flemish paintings, mainly gathered in Rome, then moved in the mid-17th century almost entirely to Parma, first to the Palazzo del Giardino and then to the Palazzo della Pilotta, before the final transfer to Naples which began in 1735. In the royal palace, therefore, is preserved what is the most substantial and significant core of the Farnese painting collection. Also housed there are additional items such as porcelains, ceramics, plates, kitchen utensils, armor, silverware, tapestries, and goldsmith work.

In the Royal Palace of Naples, there are also other Farnese works, such as those in Room XVIII, dedicated to Emilian painting; the wing of the royal residence that houses the national library, on the other hand, contains the book collections of the Farnese library.

== Principal sculptures ==
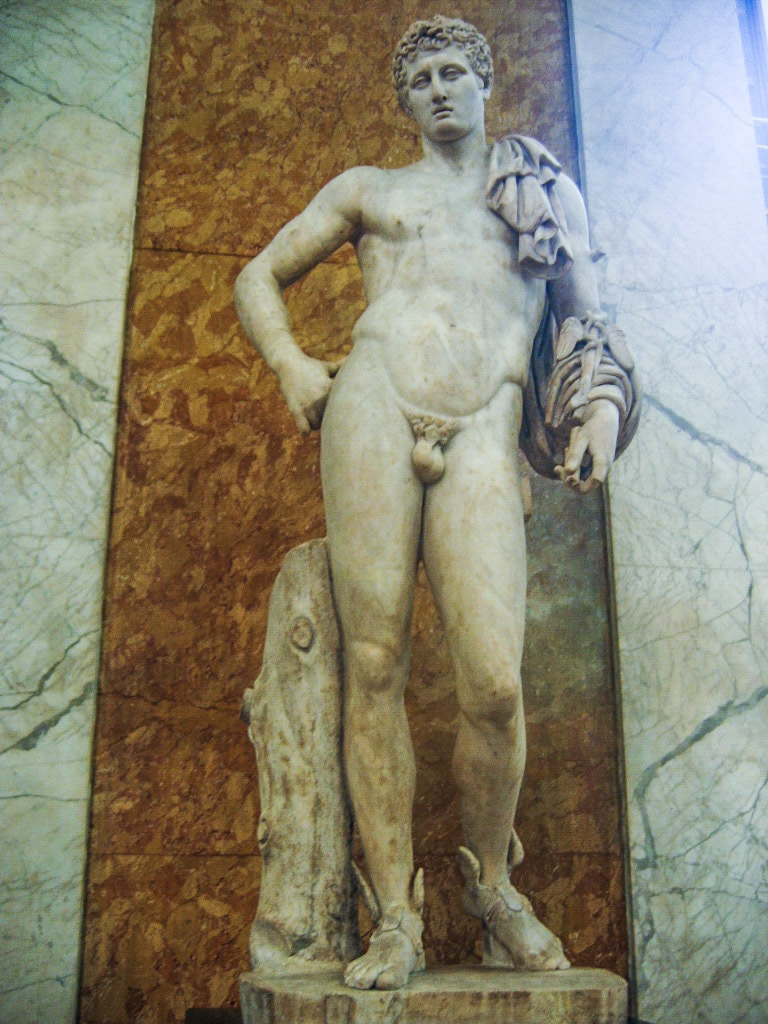
Farnese Hermes in the British Museum

The collection contains many copies of ancient Greek statues, and provides a broad review of classic Roman sculpture. Among the principal sculptural works are:

=== In the National Archaeological Museum of Naples ===
- the Farnese Hercules
- the Farnese Cup
- the Farnese Bull
- the Farnese Artemis
- the Farnese Flora
- the Farnese Gladiator
- the Venus Kallipygos
- the Farnese Atlas
- the Farnese Athena

=== In the British Museum, London ===
- the Farnese Hermes
- the Farnese Diadumenos

== See also ==
- Townley collection
