= Diadumenos =

Sculpture by Polykleitos (youth tying headband)

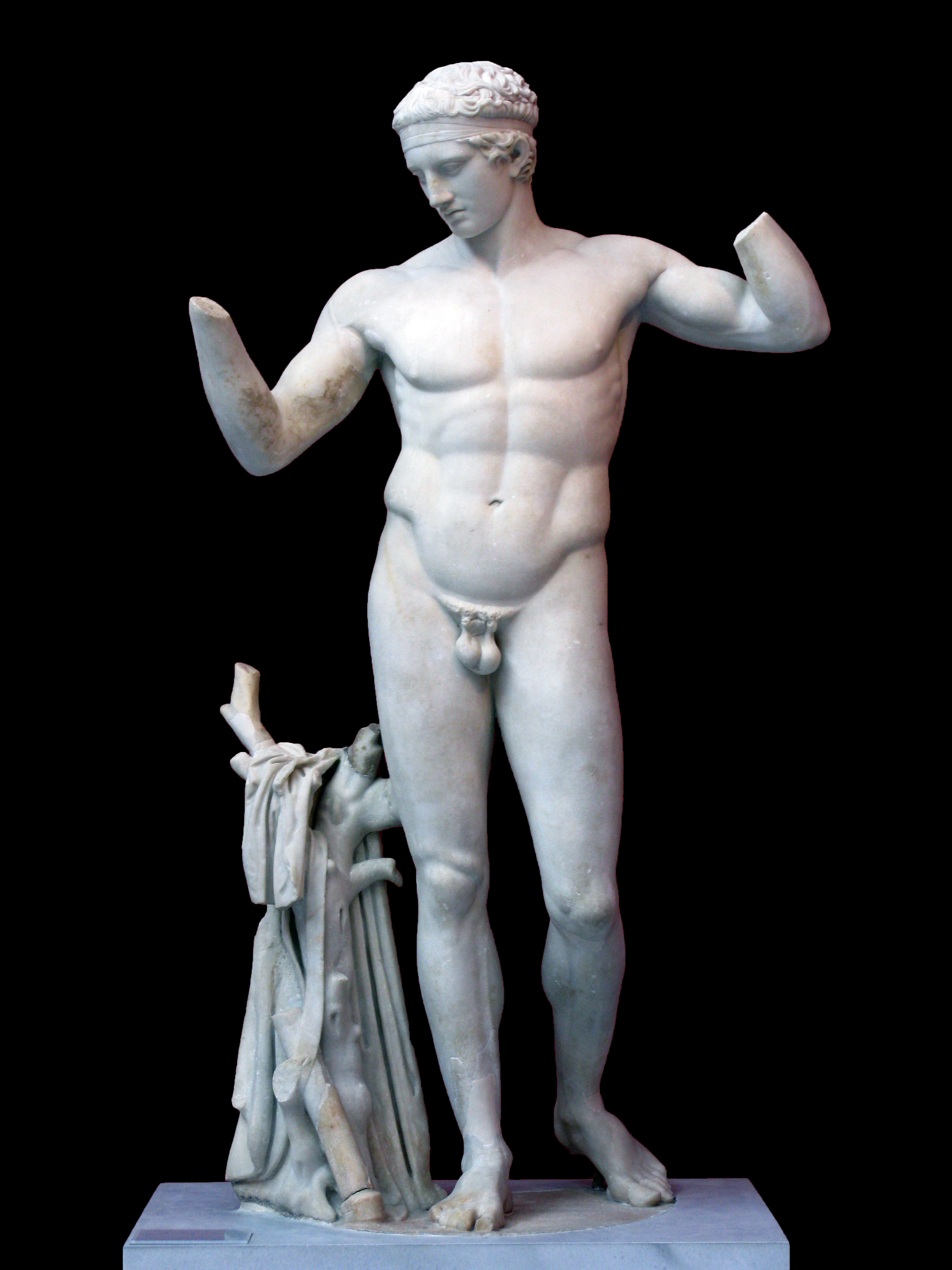
The Athens example, with the quiver in view. National Archaeological Museum of Athens. Height: 1.95 metres (6 feet 4 inches)

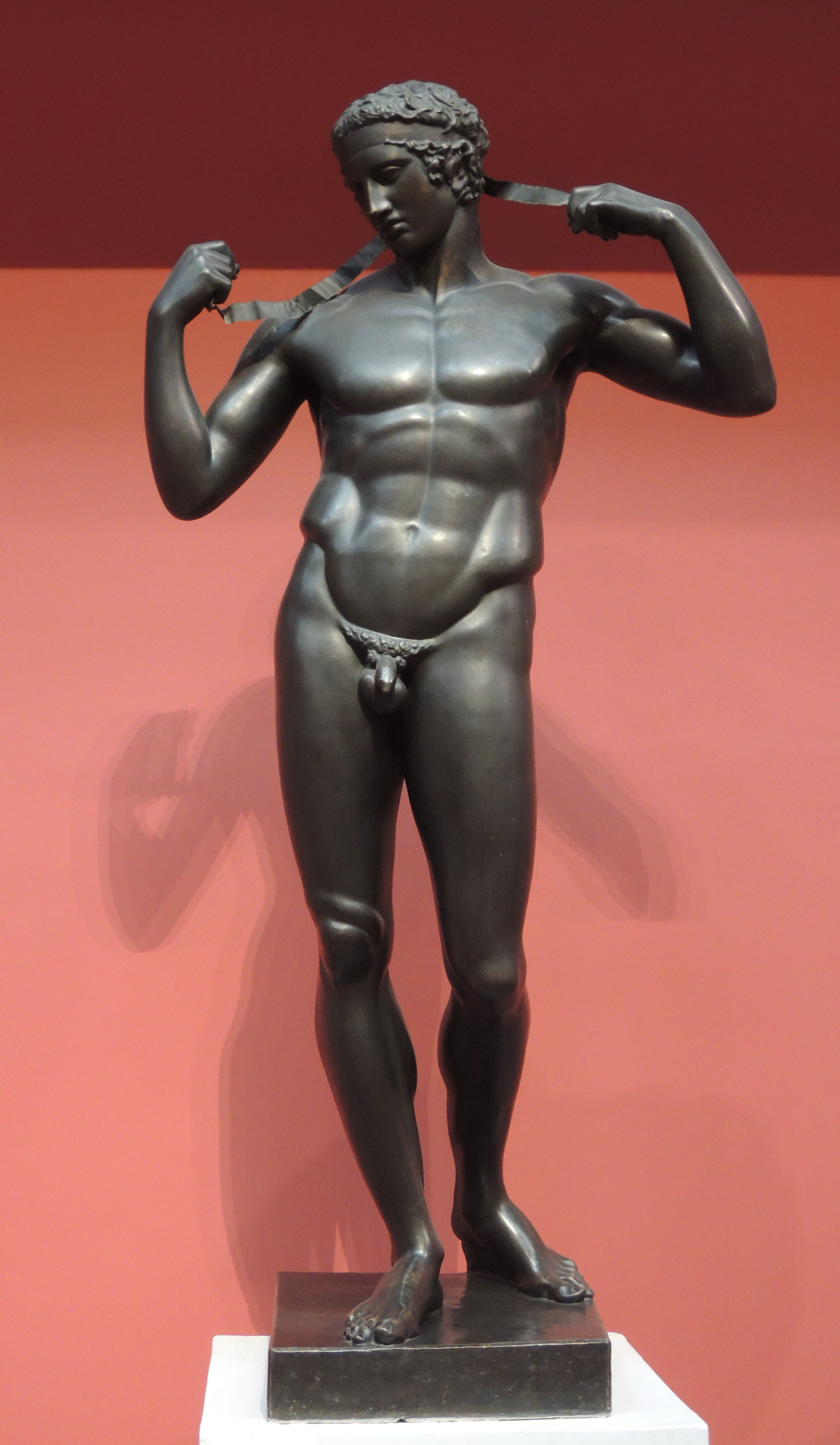
Reconstruction, in a patinated cast at the Pushkin Museum, Moscow

The Diadumenos (Ancient Greek: διαδούμενος, romanized: diadúmenos, 'diadem-bearer', the winner of an athletic contest at a games), together with the Doryphoros (spear bearer), are two of the most famous figural types of the sculptor Polyclitus, forming a basic pattern of Ancient Greek sculpture that all present a strictly idealized representations of young male athletes in a naturalistic manner.

The Diadumenos is still nude after the contest, and is lifting his arms to knot the diadem, a headband that identifies the winner, which in the bronze original of about 420 BCE would have been represented by a bronze ribbon. The figure stands in contrapposto with his weight on his right foot, his left knee slightly bent and his head inclined slightly to the right, self-contained, seeming to be lost in thought. Phidias was credited with a statue of a victor at Olympia in the act of tying the fillet around his head; besides Polyclitus, his successors Lysippos and Scopas also created figures of this kind.

== Roman copies ==
Both Pliny's Natural History and Lucian's Philopseudes described Roman marbles of a Diadumenos copied from Greek originals in bronze, yet it was not recognized until 1878 that the Roman marble from Vaison-la-Romaine (Roman Vasio) in the British Museum and two others recreate the lost Polyclitan bronze original. Pliny recorded that the Polyclitan original fetched at auction the extraordinary price of a hundred talents, an enormous sum in Antiquity, as Adolf Furtwängler pointed out. Indeed, Roman marble copies must have abounded, to judge from the number of recognizable fragments and complete works, including a head at the Louvre, a complete example at the Metropolitan Museum of Art, another complete example at the Prado Museum, and another complete example of somewhat different character, the somewhat below lifesize Roman marble Farnese Diadumenos at the British Museum, which preserves the end of the ribband falling from the right hand. Another version in the British Museum, slightly damaged but in otherwise reasonable condition, is from Vaison in France. Freer versions were executed in reduced scale as bronze statuettes, and the head of Diadumenos-type appears on numerous Roman engraved gems.

The marble Diadumenos from Delos at the National Museum, Athens (right) has the winner's cloak and his quiver laid upon the tree stump, hinting that he is the victor in an archery match, with perhaps an implied reference to Apollo, who was conceived, too, as an idealized youth.

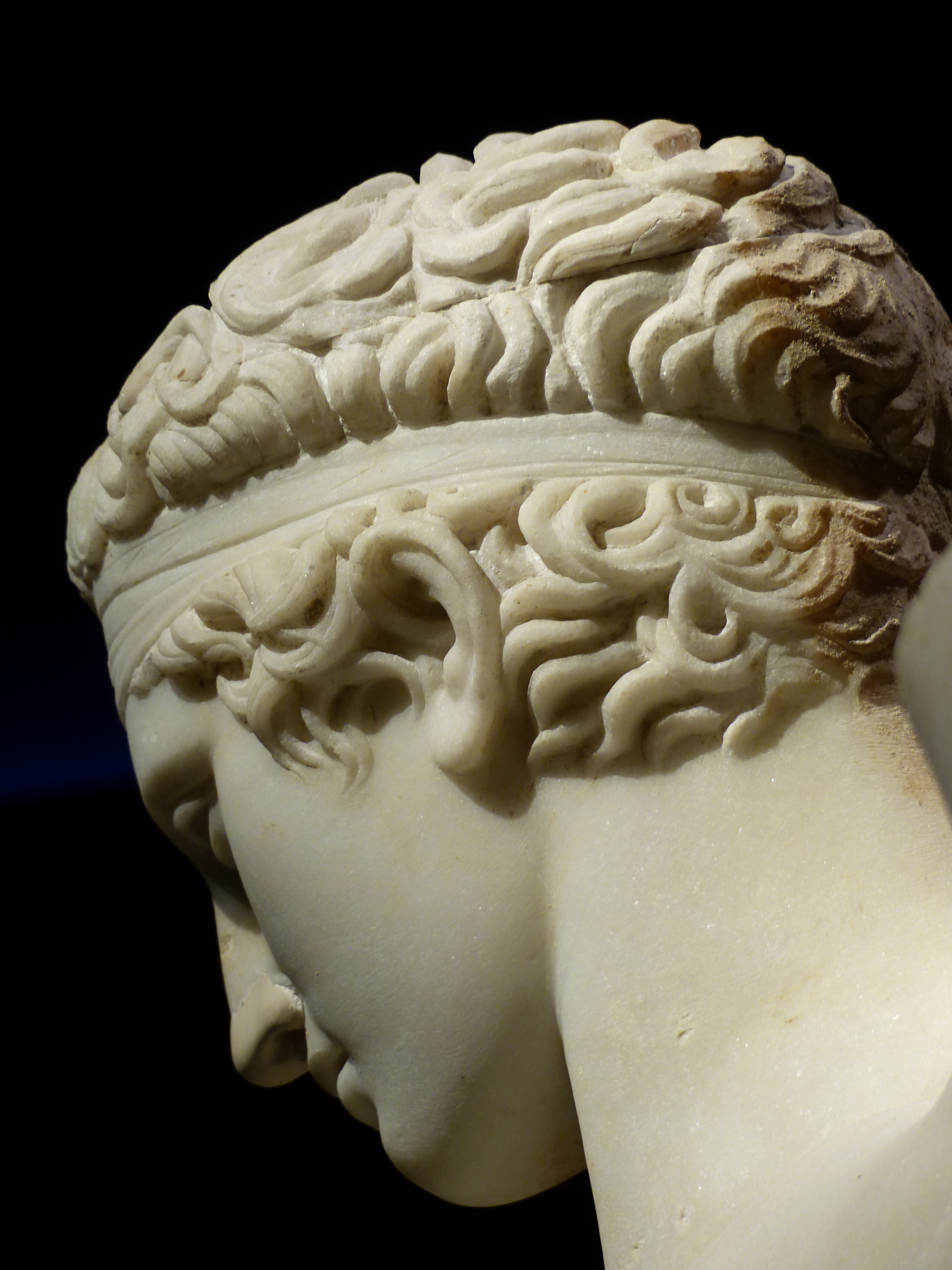
Detail

== Modern reception ==
Once the Diadumenos type had been reconnected with Polyclitus in 1878, it was recognised in the modern era by a copy included among the sculptures on the roof of the National Archaeological Museum, Athens when it was completed in 1889. The Esquiline Venus has sometimes been interpreted as a female version of the diadumenos type (a diadumene, a woman tying a diadem).

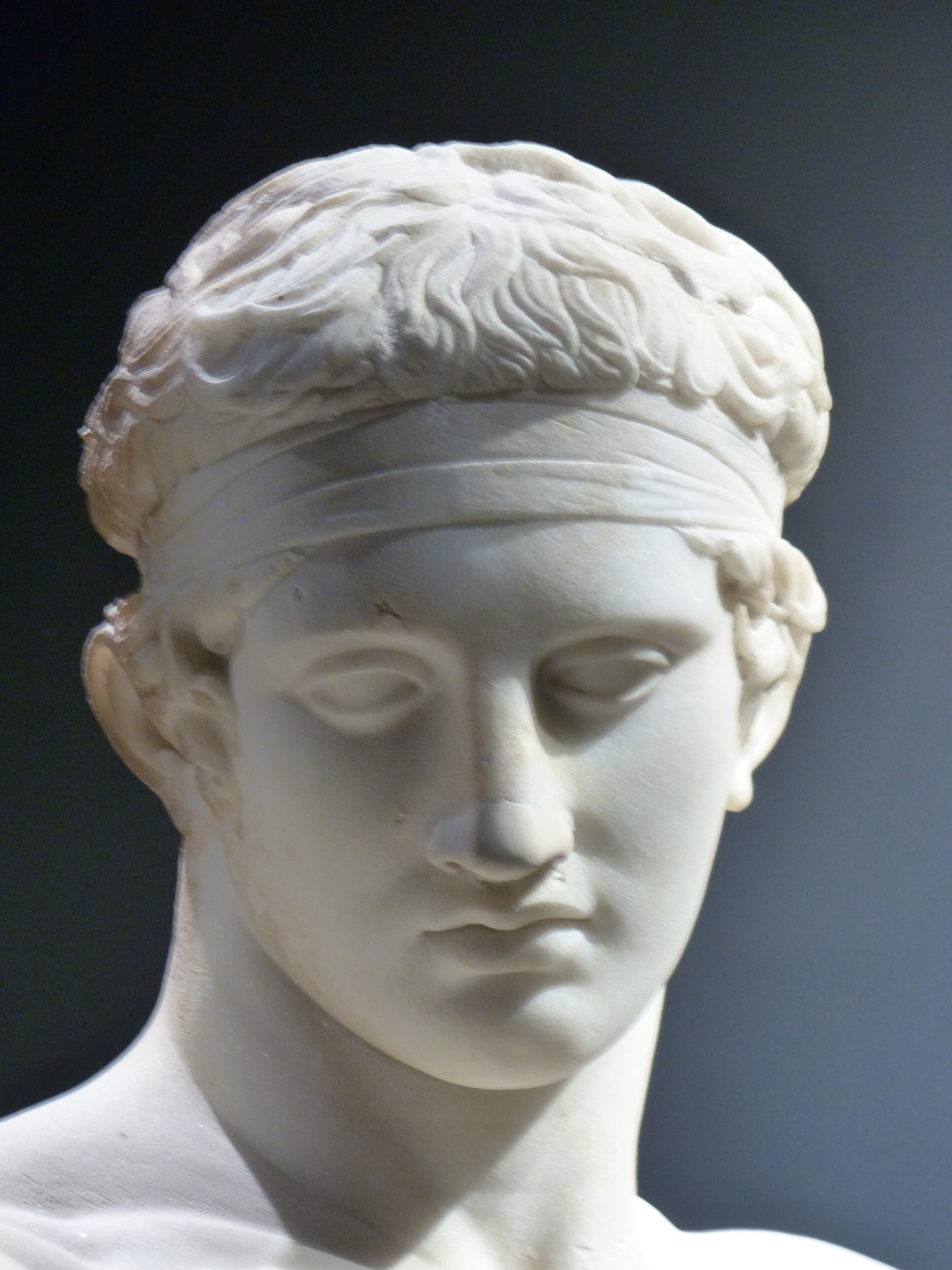
Head of the Diadumenos type
