= Apollonius of Tralles =

Apollonius of Tralles (Ancient Greek: Άπολλώνιος ὁ Τραλλιανός) was an Ancient Greek sculptor who flourished in the 2nd century BCE. With his brother Tauriscus, he executed the marble group known as the Farnese Bull, representing Zethus and Amphion tying the revengeful Dirce to the tail of a wild bull.
