= Farnese Artemis =

Sculpture in the Farnese Collection, Naples

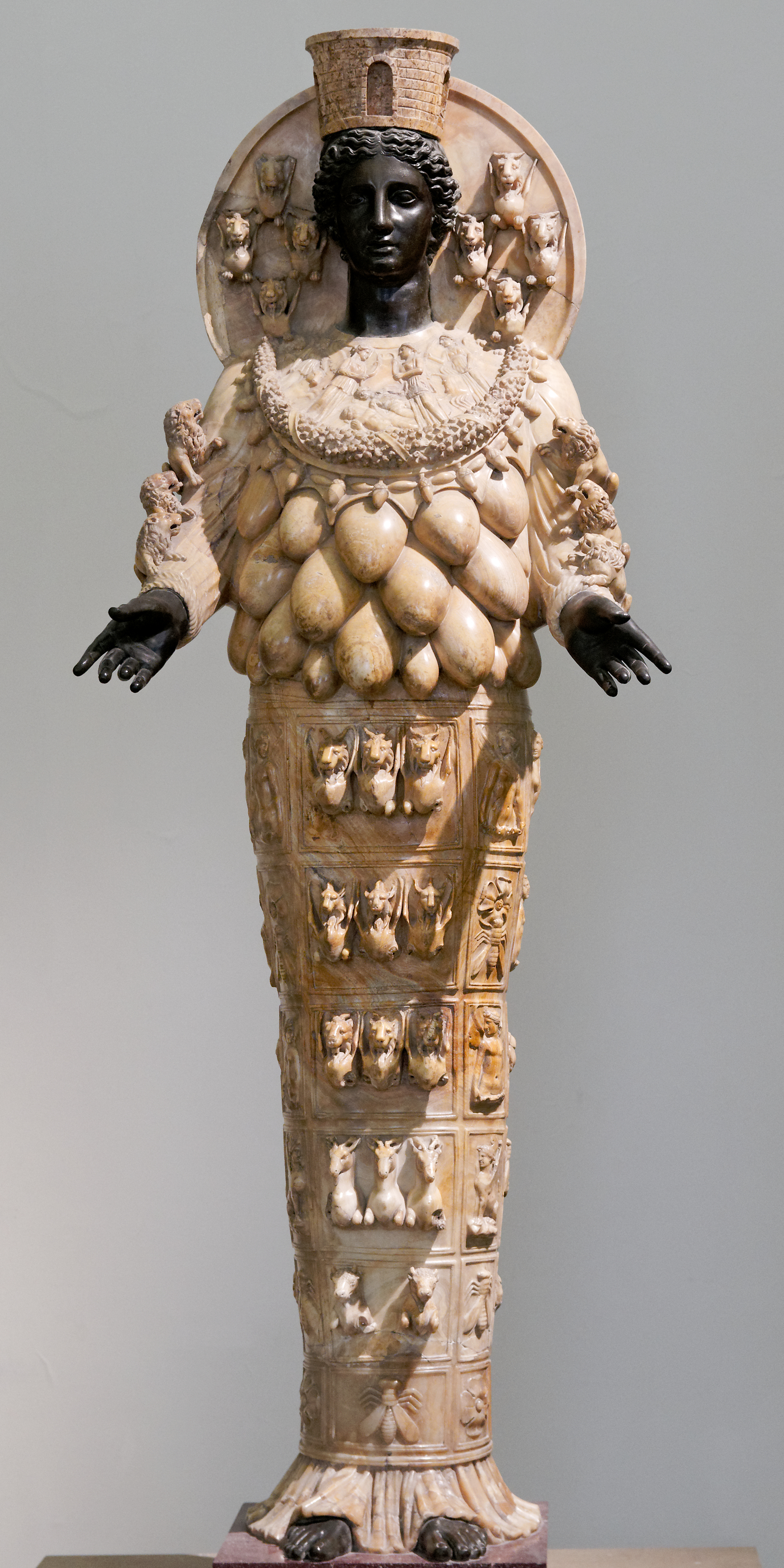
- Sculpture in the National Archaeological Museum, Naples
- Year: c. 2nd century AD
- Subject: Artemis of Ephesus
- Dimensions: 130 cm (51 in)
- Location: National Archaeological Museum, Naples
- Accession: 6278

The Farnese Artemis or Artemis of Ephesus is a 2nd-century AD sculpture of the ancient goddess Artemis of Ephesus. It is part of the Farnese Collection in the National Archaeological Museum, Naples (Inv. numb. 6278).

The statue relates to an ancient cult celebrated in Ephesus (now in İzmir Province, Turkey), where Artemis was venerated in her temple as the goddess of nature and ruler of wild beasts. It is a replica of the wooden simulacrum of the Ephesian Artemis.

== Description ==
The statue is dated to the 2nd century AD and made of alabaster and painted bronze and appears as a Xoanon, a wooden cult statue. It has a height of 1.30 m (4 ft 3 in).

An 1883 English handbook to the museum provides the following description of the statue:

6278. Diana of Ephesus. A statue of Oriental alabaster with bronze extremities. The goddess wears a tower on her head and an aureole decorated with eight griffins. Round her neck a handsome collar of cereals fringed with acorns, and above it a design of female figures in bas-relief. Three lions are upon each arm, and between the arms the numerous breasts symbolical of her nourishing the world. Her skirt is covered with mythical and other animals. (Farnese.)

— Domenico Monaco, A Complete Handbook to the National Museum in Naples

The statue wears a chiton, visible only along the goddess' arms and feet. Over her chiton, Artemis is depicted wearing an ependytes, a decorated overdress. Additionally, she wears a crescent-shaped breastplate, from which small acorns are hanging.

The 1883 handbook identified the objects under the small acorns as symbolic female breasts (polymastia). The museum, however, now states that these are, in fact bull scrotums, sacrificed to the goddess. The reasoning behind this interpretation is that the anatomical parts are made of bronze while the decorative parts are made in alabaster. More generally, the scholarship on all depictions of the Ephesian Artemis is not settled on this point. Andrew E. Hill, an Old Testament scholar at Wheaton College, Illinois, wrote in 1992 that the interpretations include identifications of the "'multiple-breasts' as bee or ostrich eggs, grapes, nuts or acorns, bull testicles, some type of jewelry, articles of clothing, or stylized human breasts" and feared that "a truly convincing solution to the problem may never emerge in light of existing archaeological, historical, and iconographic evidence."

Each of the arms of the goddess is lined with three lions. The lions are oriented so that they appear to be climbing up the arms.

On her head, the statue wears a polos, a head ornament in the shape of a tower. Around her head a nimbus with four winged lions is visible.

== History ==
The place of discovery of the statue is unknown. It was originally not of particular importance in the Farnese Collection exhibited in Palazzo Farnese in Rome. Archival records only exist beginning in 1786, before its arrival in Naples in 1788.

The statue was restored by Carlo Albacini and Giuseppe Valadier. Albacini restored the missing alabaster parts, while Valadier was tasked with making the head, hands, and feet in painted bronze.

== Influence ==
The statue is the model for the 1568 Fountain of Nature (Fountain of Diana of Ephesus) by Gillis van den Vliete in the Villa d'Este near Rome.

== Gallery ==
Pictures of the statue
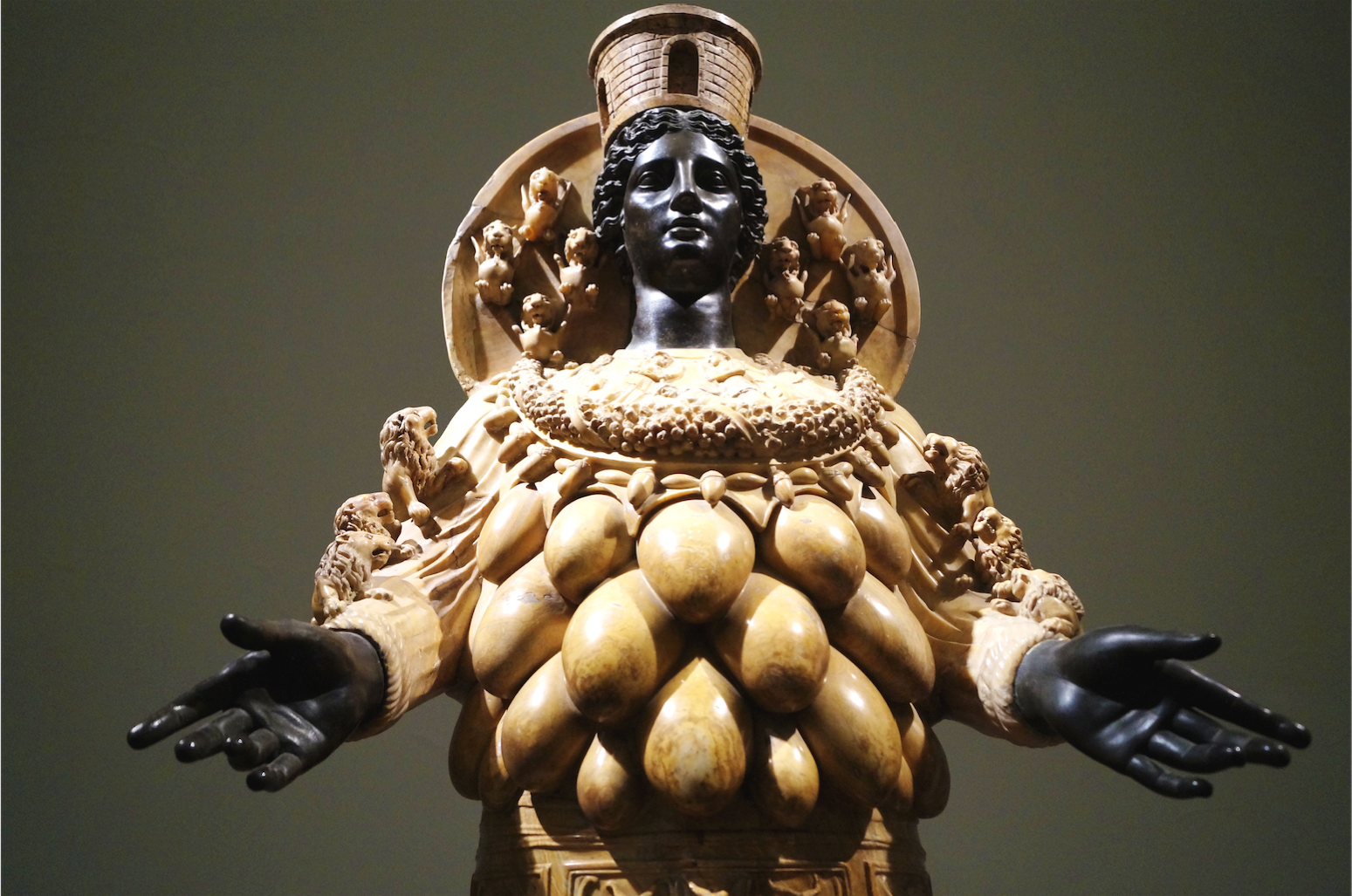
Close-up of the body

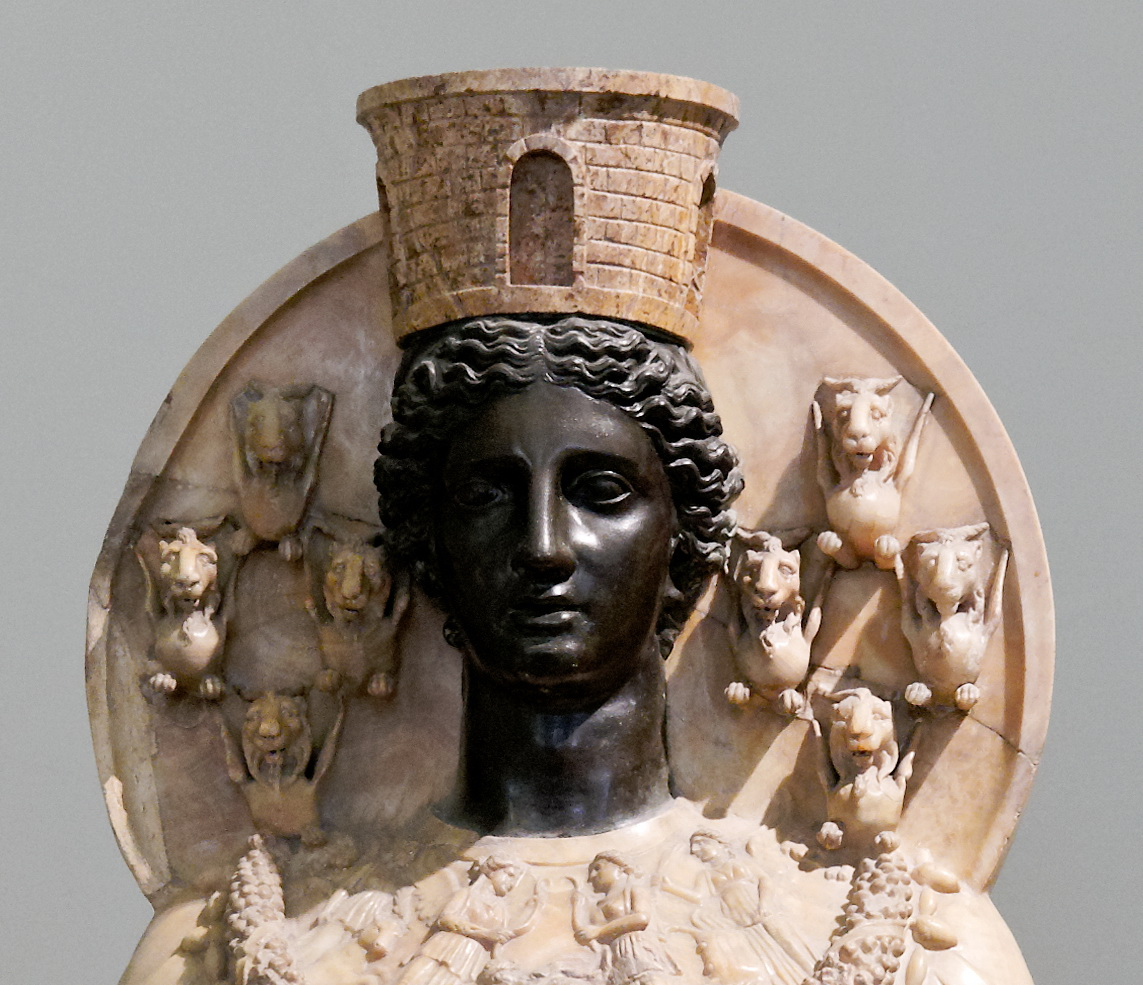
Close-up of the head

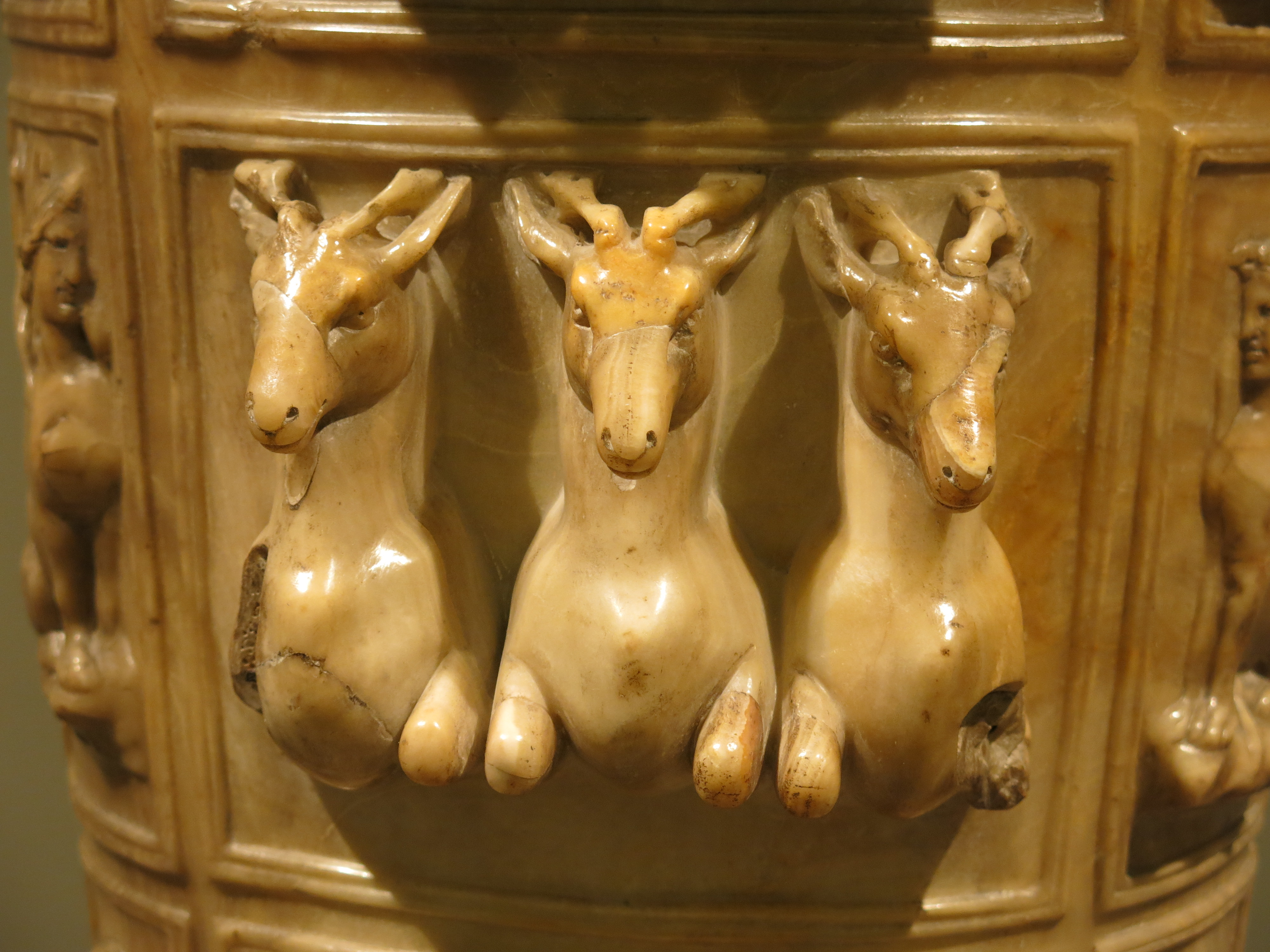
Detail of the lower body

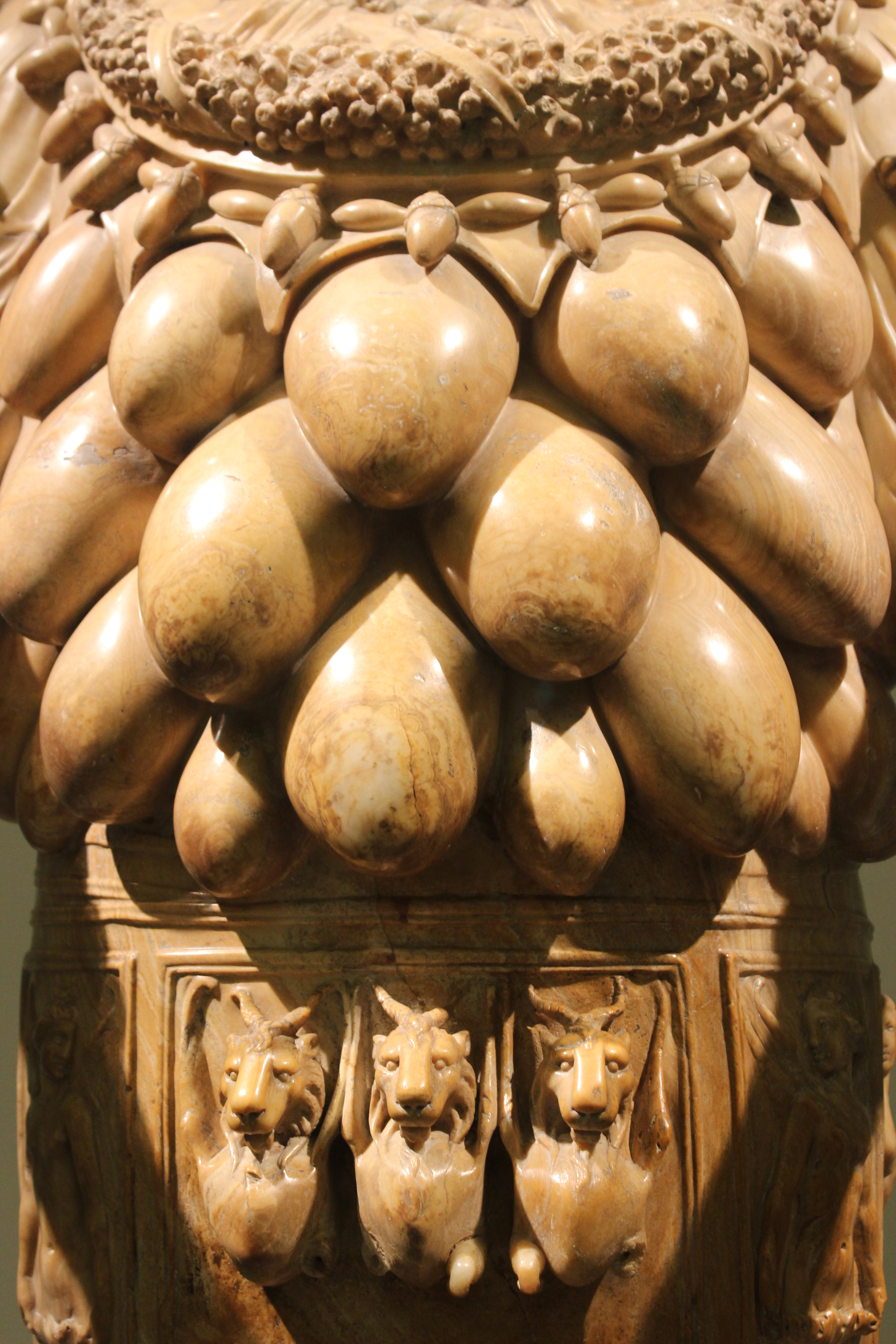
Close-up of the bull scrotums or breasts

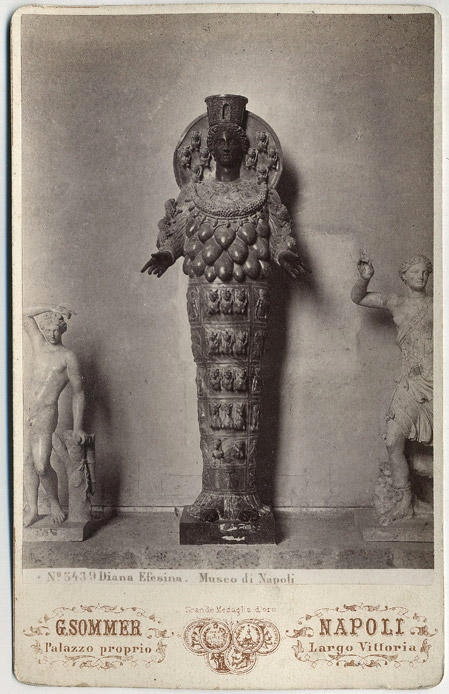
Early photo of the statue by Giorgio Sommer
