= Farnese Diadumenos =

Copy of the Polykleitos sculpture once owned by the future Paul III

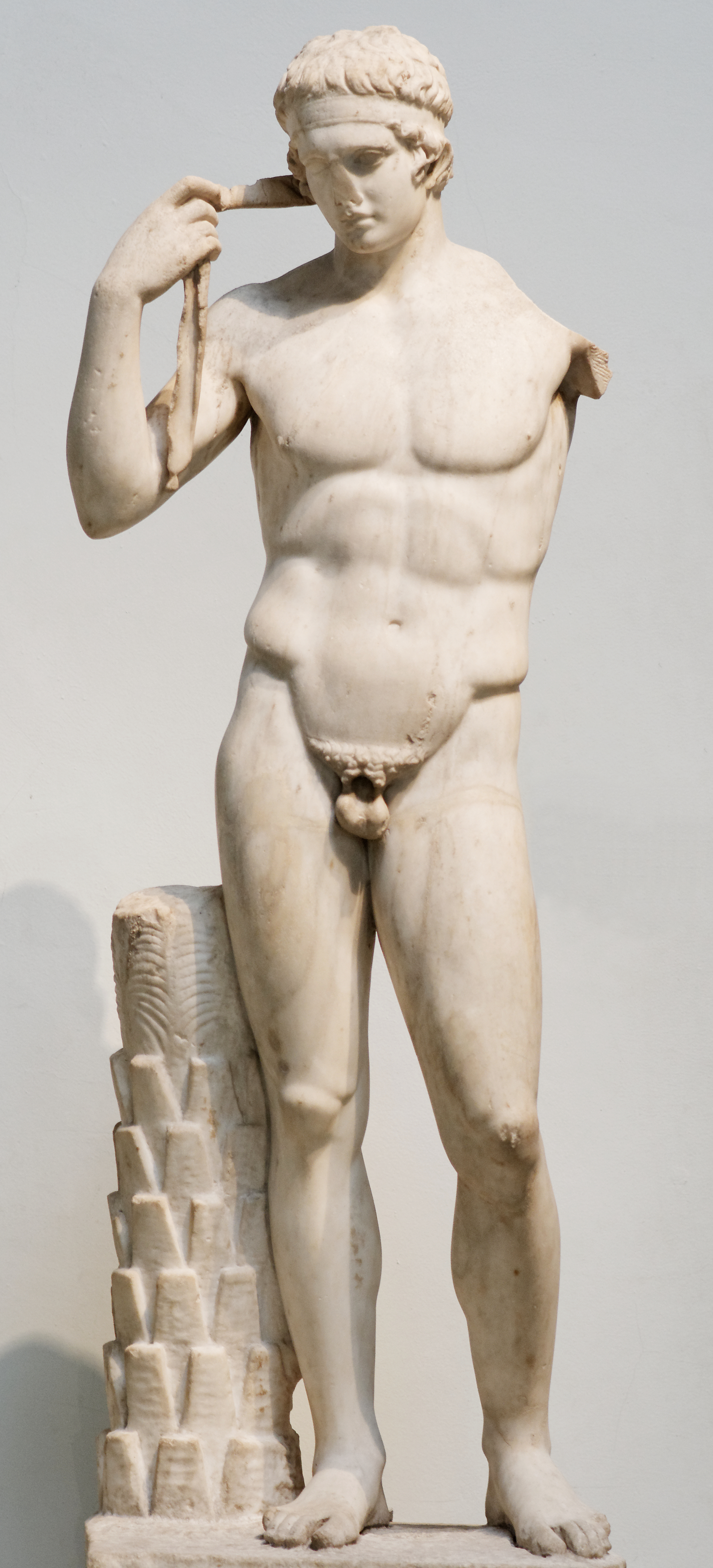
The Farnese Diadumenos (British Museum)

The Farnese Diadumenos is a 1st-century AD sculpture in the British Museum formerly in the Farnese Collection.

It is usually said that it is the late Roman marble copy of Polykleitos's Diadumenos sculpture. But, despite the same subject, it differs from the statue of Polykleitos.

== Description ==
It represents a nude standing youth, tying a band or 'taenia' round his head. The arms were raised, but the left arm and shoulder are now lost. The hair is blurred due to weathering. The right leg has been altered and repaired. By the side of the statue are the remains of a palm-support. The statue was acquired from the Farnese Collection in 1864.

== Anadoumenos ==
Some scientists say that Famese Diadoumenos actually should be associated with a Pheidian athlete of the same iconography called Anadoumenos (The ribbon-wearer) known from ancient sources.

According to Pausanius, Pheidian ivory relief with same name made c. 430 BC stood near Temple of Zeus, Olympia. The youth looked like Pantarkes, the Eleian boy whom Phidias loved (he won the boys' wrestling competition in the 86th Olympiad: 436 BC). He said there was also round bronze statue with same name, also by Phidias, but it represented unknown athlete. Also in Olympia stood athlete Pantarkes' statue by unknown author.

With this statue of Phidias researchers (after Giovanni Becatti) associate two types of late copies:

- Diadoumenos Farnese
- The Petworth head type, named after the head in the Petworth House collection, four other replicas: in Florence, New York, Trier and formerly in the Abbati collection. Many scholars agree that the head type goes back to Pheidias, though they disagree strongly about the identity of the figure with athlete.

"Nevertheless, as the temple image has now been dated in the 430s BC on external evidence - the finds in the workshop - Becatti's complicated attribution of both statue types to Pheidias and to two different athletes has to be rejected" is written in 1990s article.

== Prototype ==
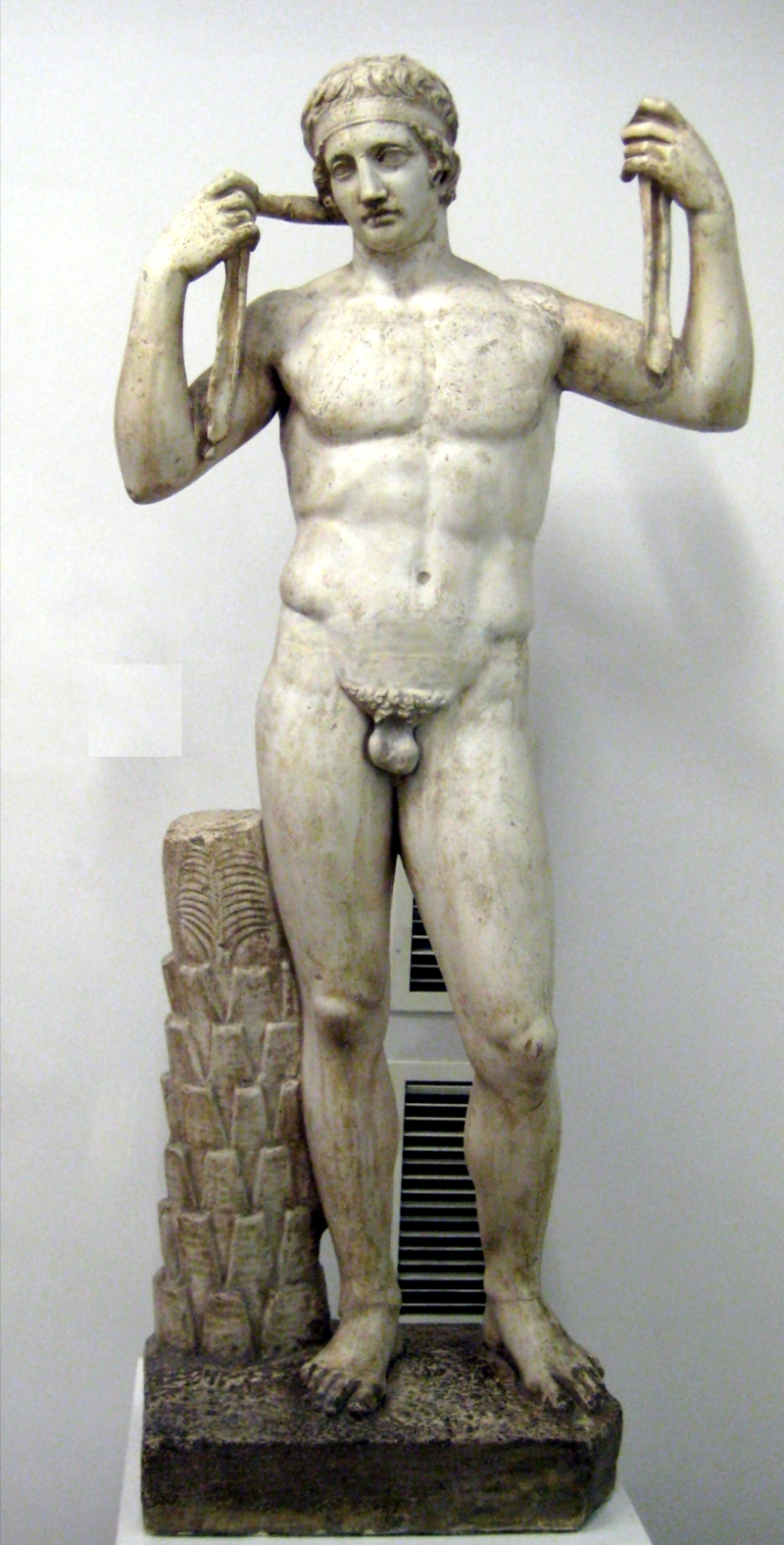
19th-century reconstruction. Plaster cast in Pushkin museum

The fact that only one mediocre example of Farnese Diadumenos exists has led P. Zanker to identify the statue as a Roman reproduction of a classical original from the early 1st century BC, inspired by Polykleitos' Diadoumenos (particularly the replica from Delos now in Athens).

John Boardman believes the Farnese Diadoumenos is a copy of an earlier work from around 450-440 BC, displaying a pre-Polykleitan style with both heels on the ground, possibly linked to Pheidias or Polykleitos.

A. Corso concurs with this dating for the original, suggesting that the statue has been overly polished, resulting in a softer line that aligns more with the tastes of the copyist than the original design. By comparing the pose's rhythm with that of figure V from the west frieze of the Parthenon and examining the hair and fillet styles alongside those of the Copenhagen Anakreon, Corso argues that the work likely derives from a Classical statue possibly created by Pheidias.

== See also ==
- Vaison Diadumenos, also in the British Museum

== Bibliography ==
- Strocka, V. M. (2004) Pheidias, Anadumenos in Olympia, in Kiinstlerlexikon der Antike, Vol. 2, 228-29, edited by Vollkommer, D. and R. Miinchen: K. G. SaUL
