= Vaison Diadumenos =

Roman marble statue found in France

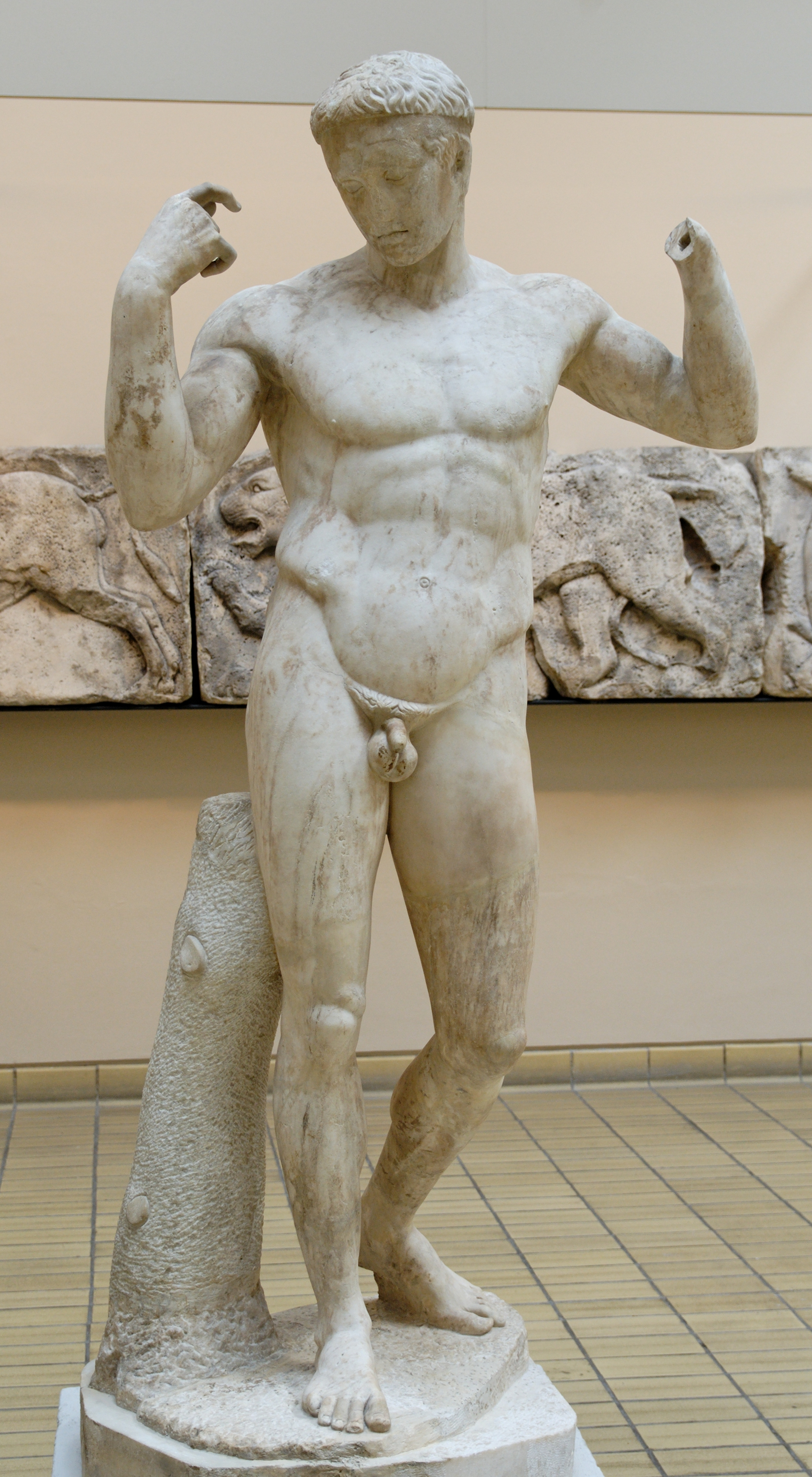
- The Vaison Diadumenos on display in the British Museum
- Material: Marble
- Size: 1.82 m (6 ft 0 in) high
- Created: 118–138 AD
- Discovered: Vaison-la-Romaine, France
- Present location: British Museum, London
- Registration: 1870,0712.1

The Vaison Diadumenos is a life size marble statue of an athlete found at the Roman city of Vaison, southern France. Since 1870, it has been part of the British Museum's collection.

== Discovery ==
The statue known as the Vaison Diadumenos was discovered in the latter part of the nineteenth century in the Roman theatre at Vaison-La-Romaine, department of Vaucluse, southern France. It was offered for sale to the Louvre, which was not prepared to pay the price asked, and was purchased by the British Museum, where it has remained ever since, in 1870.

== Description ==
The sculpture is one of a series of Roman statues found across the empire that were modelled on a lost original made in bronze by the sculptor Polykleitos in about 440 BC. The Diadumenos was the winner of an athletic tournament at a games, still nude after the contest and lifting his arms to knot a ribbon-band across his head. The Vaison statue is missing his left hand and ribbon but is otherwise in good condition. The statue would have been displayed in a prominent position in the theatre, proudly demonstrating the sophistication of the local Roman citizenry and their commitment to the ideals of Ancient Greece.

== See also ==
- Farnese Diadumenos, also in the British Museum

== Gallery ==
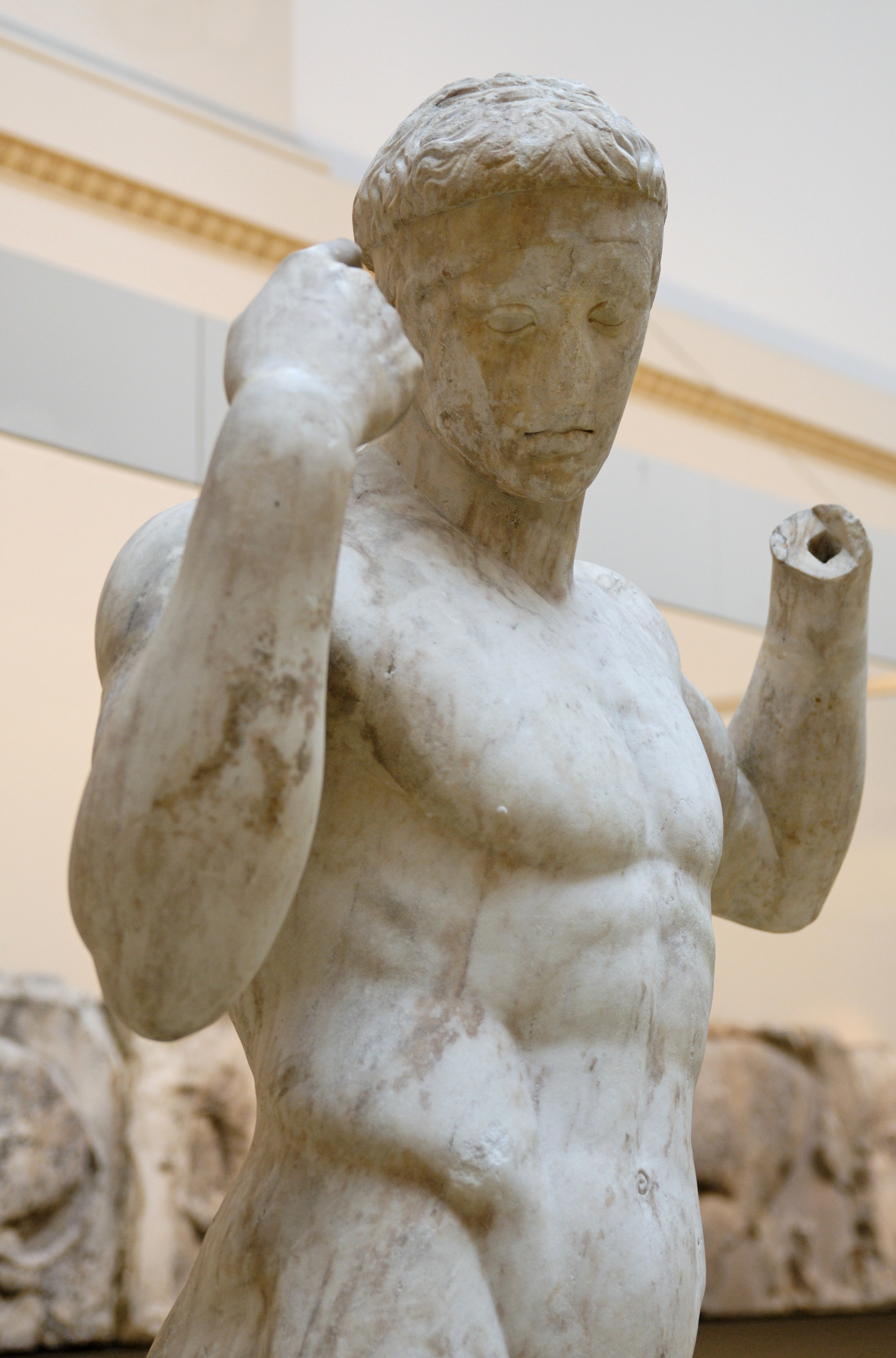
View of the face and body of the statue

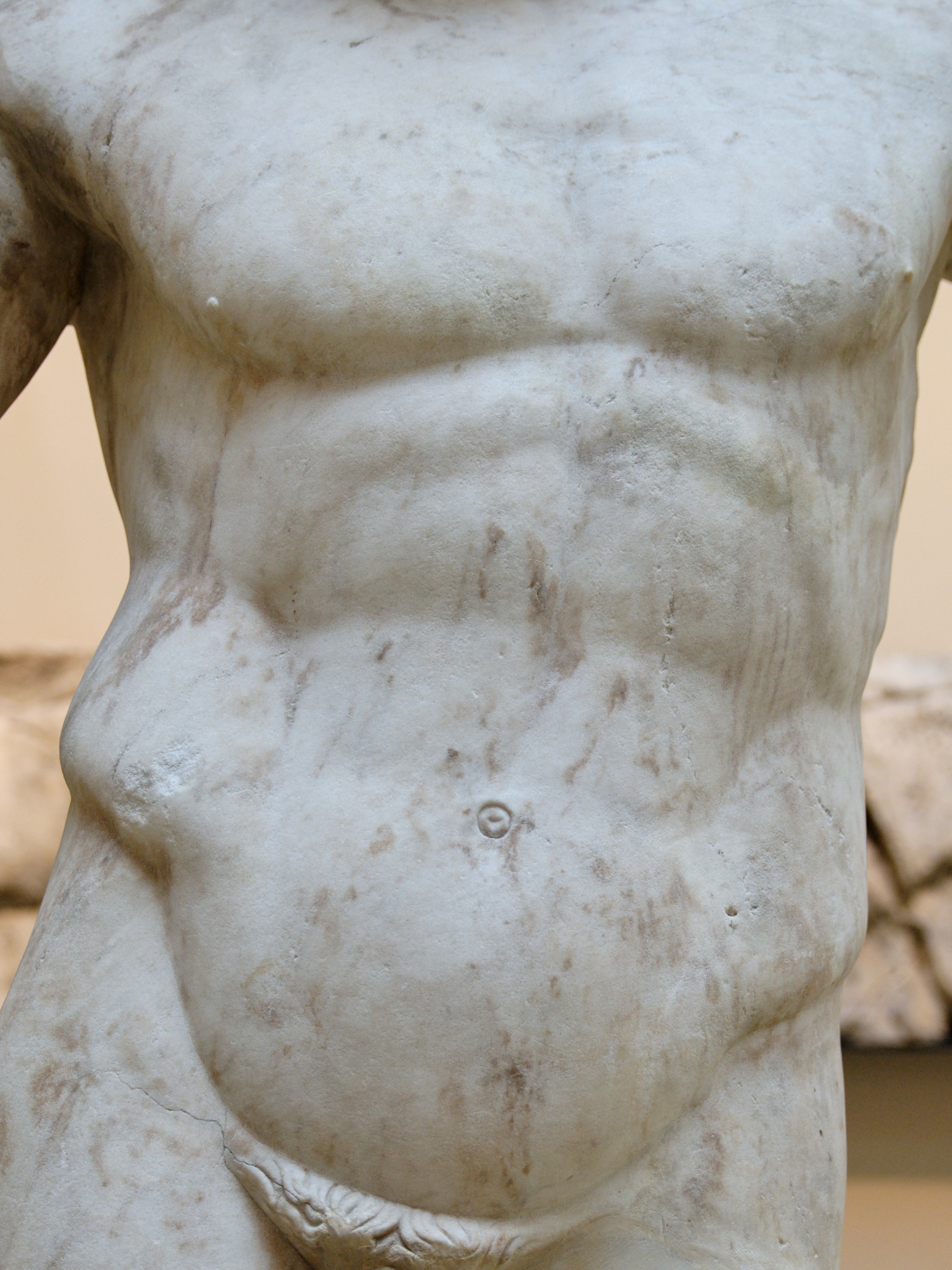
Close-up of the torso

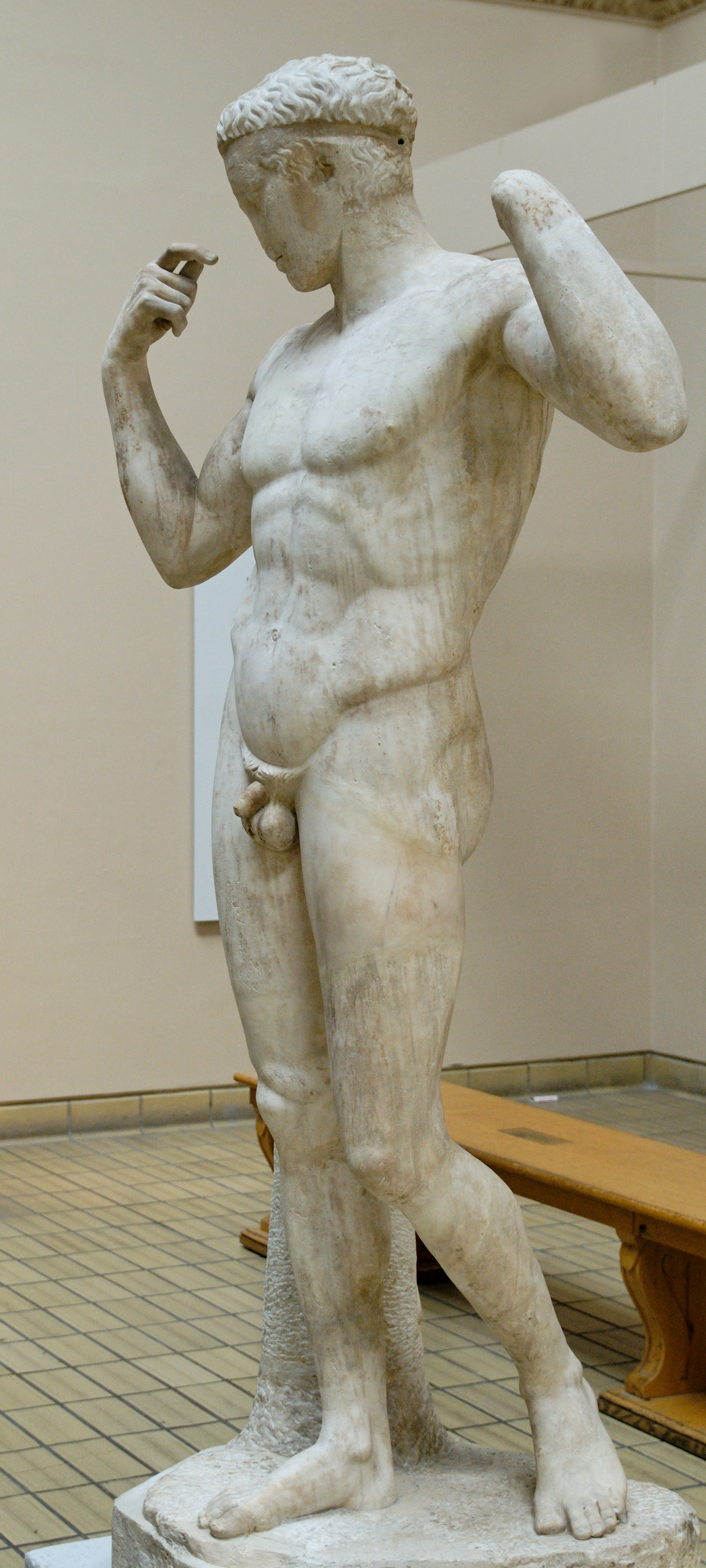
Image of the statue from another angle

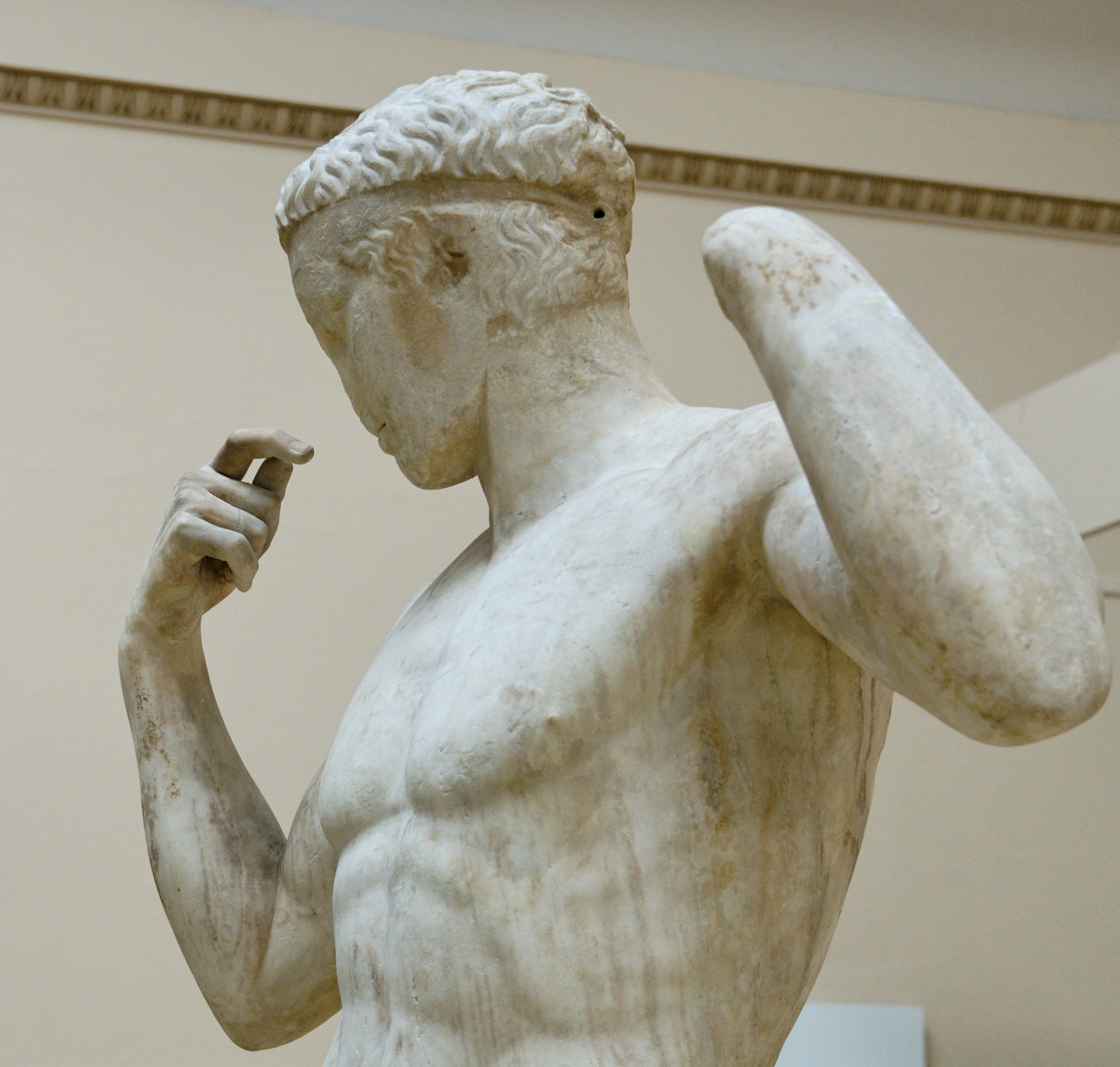
Detail of the upper part of the sculpture
