= Aquileia Dish =

Roman relief silver plate

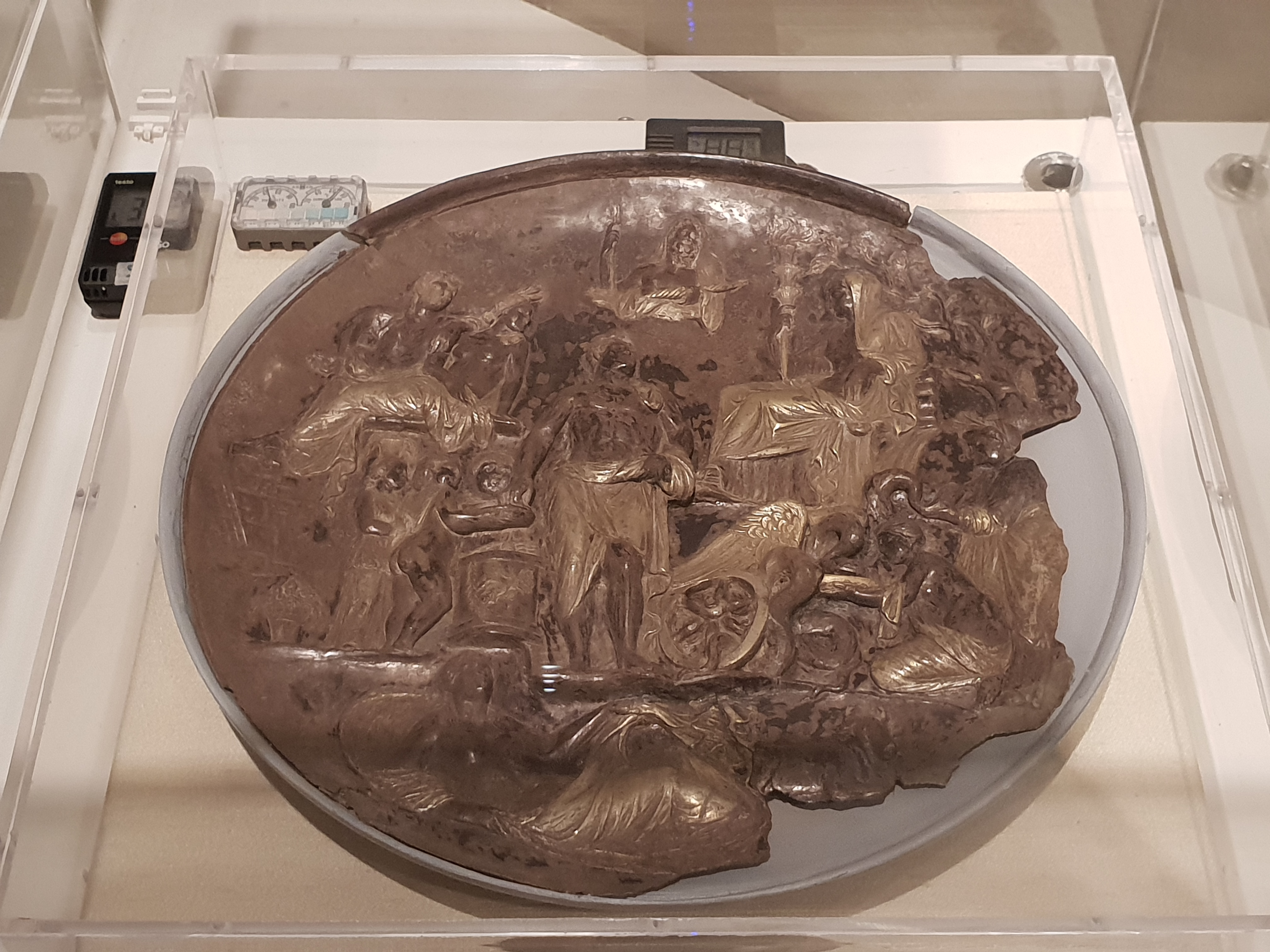
- Picture taken in 2018 at the Kunsthistorisches Museum
- Type: Decorative platter
- Material: Silver and gold (silver-gilt)
- Discovered: First half of the 19th-century Monastery near Aquileia
- Discovered by: Ignaz Franz de Cassis
- Present location: Roman collection at the Kunsthistorisches Museum, Vienna
- Culture: Disputed, probably Roman, Hellenistic, or Ptolemaic

The Aquileia Dish is an ancient originally gilded (Note: The gold has worn away.) silver plate found in Aquileia though its original place of creation is unknown and the subject of debate. It is now in the Kunsthistorisches Museum in Vienna. It is decorated with a relief of several mythological figures, which are often believed to represent real life persons, though their exact identification are disputed. A common theory is that it was created for the Egyptian royal couple Cleopatra and Mark Antony, who may be depicted on the relief in the guise of the deities Demeter and Triptolemos, along with their three children.

== Provenance ==
The modern provenance of the piece begins with its discovery by count Ignaz Franz de Cassis during the early 19th century in a monastery near Aquileia. Cassis gave it to Francis II, Holy Roman Emperor, who then donated it to the Kunsthistorisches Museum in Vienna in 1825.

== Subject ==
The relief depicts eleven human figures, two men, six women, and three children. Of the figures only the central one is identified by the museum, naming him as Triptolemos, which several scholars agree with. The woman next to him is likely Demeter, whom he was the consort of in classical mythology. Variously the children have been identified as the offspring of a Roman emperor, standing with their father (in the guise of Triptolemos) as he performs religious sacrifices. One proposal is that it depicts Claudius with his son Britannicus, step-son Nero, and daughter Claudia Octavia. Another is that it depicts Mark Antony and Cleopatra with their children Cleopatra Selene II, Alexander Helios, and Ptolemy Philadelphus.

== Analysis ==
The art historian Julia C. Fischer believes the plate to have been created during the 30s BC in Alexandria for Queen Cleopatra and Mark Antony for propaganda purposes, aimed at an elite Roman Republican audience, so was modeled on Roman art and used Roman iconography. Fischer argues in her 2024 book Power and Propaganda in the Large Imperial Cameos of the Early Roman Empire that the commissioning of the dish served as the impetus for the creation of the imperial cameos of the Julio-Claudian dynasty which followed, beginning with the Farnese Cup, though others attribute this latter to the 2nd century BC. The Great Cameo of France, Gemma Claudia and Gemma Augustea (all hardstone carvings) are undisputed members of the group.
