= Farnese Bull =

Roman sculpture

Coordinates: 40.8534°N 14.2505°E

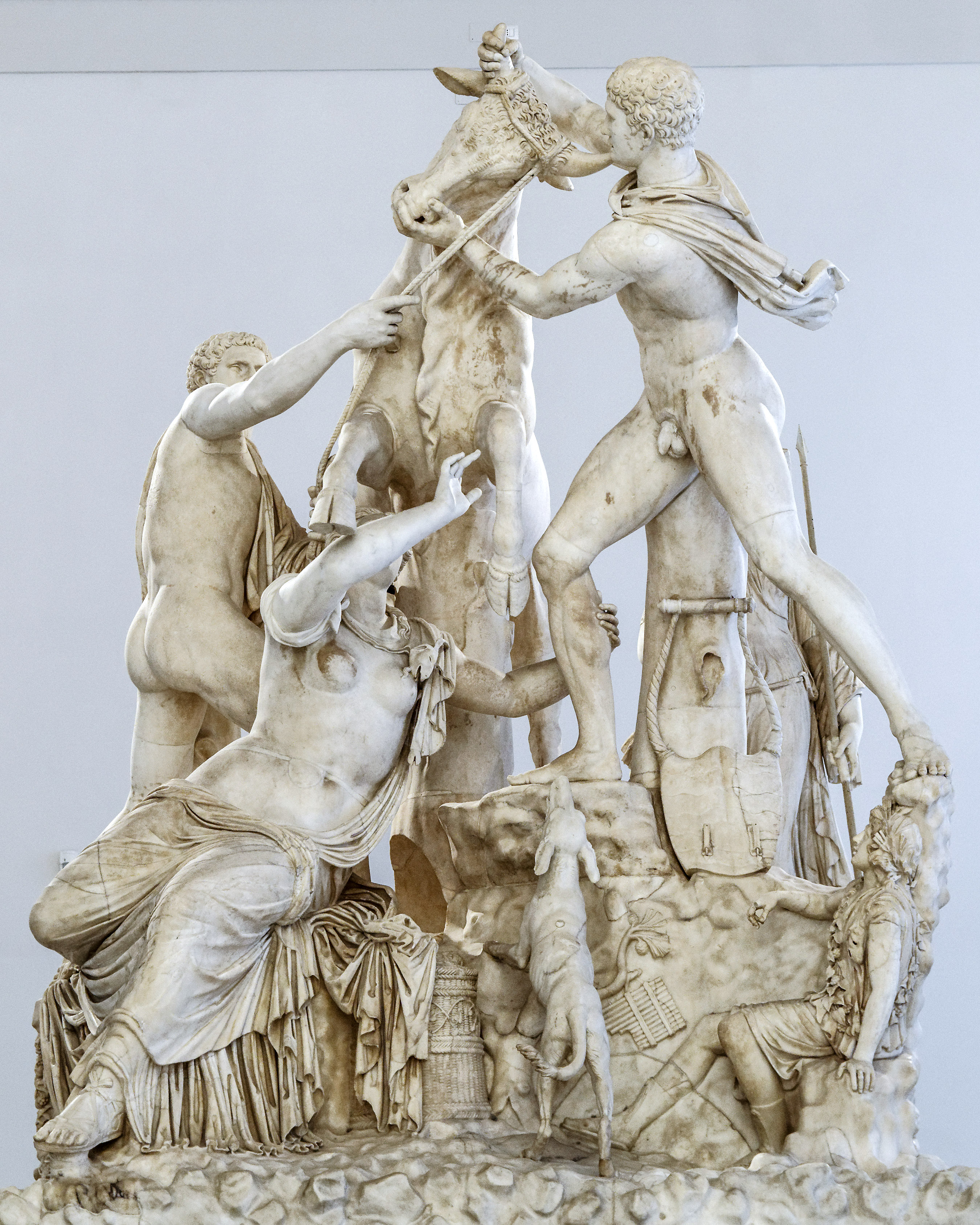
The Farnese Bull

The Farnese Bull (Italian: Toro Farnese), formerly in the Farnese collection in Rome, is a massive and elaborated Roman copy of a Hellenistic sculpture. It is the largest single sculpture yet recovered from antiquity. Along with the rest of the Farnese antiquities, since 1826 it has been in the collection of the Museo Archeologico Nazionale Napoli in Naples, inv. no. 6002, although in recent years sometimes it is displayed at the Museo di Capodimonte across the city. This sculpture is much restored and includes around the base a child, a dog, and other animals that perhaps were not in the original composition if representations in drawings are complete. This sculpture is dated to the Severan period (A.D. 222–235).

This colossal marble sculptural group represents an event related in Classical Greek mythology. The subject is the death of Dirce, first wife of Lykos, King of Thebes. She was tied to a wild bull by Amphion and Zethus, the sons of Antiope, who wanted to punish Dirce for the ill-treatment inflicted on their mother.

Pliny the Elder mentions what was presumably the prime version of the sculpture as the work of the Rhodian artists Apollonius of Tralles and his brother Tauriscus, stating that the sculpture was commissioned at the end of the second century BC and carved from just one whole block of marble. It was imported from Rhodes as part of the remarkable collection of artwork and sculpture owned by Asinius Pollio, a Roman politician who lived during the years between the Republic and the Principate.

== Rediscovery and reconstruction ==
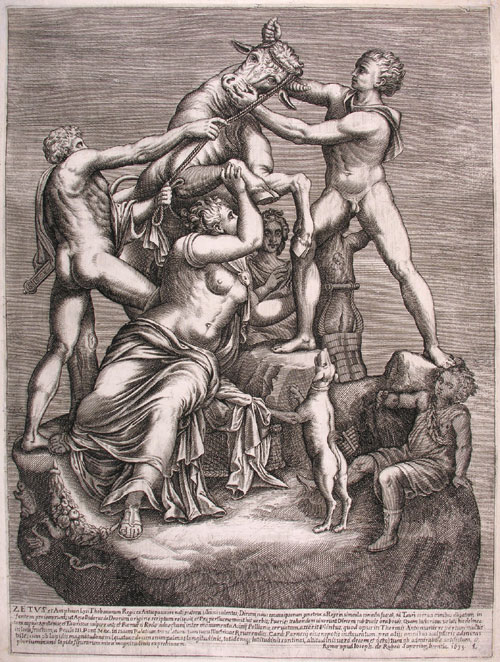
Engravings such as this, dated 1633, made the image familiar.

The sculpture was unearthed in 1546 during excavations at gymnasium of the Roman Baths of Caracalla, commissioned by Pope Paul III in the hope of finding ancient sculptures to adorn the Palazzo Farnese, the Farnese family's palatial residence in Rome. Other discoveries from this excavation were documented as to their location as individual depictions, such as the Farnese Hercules and the Latin Hercules. The only reference to this group sculpture is from a 1595 engraving by Etienne du Perac of the ruins of the Baths, showing the end of the east palestra, which states: "...in the time of Paul III many beautiful fragments of statues and animals were found that were all in one piece in antiquity... and Cardinal Farnese had [it] erected now in his Palazzo."

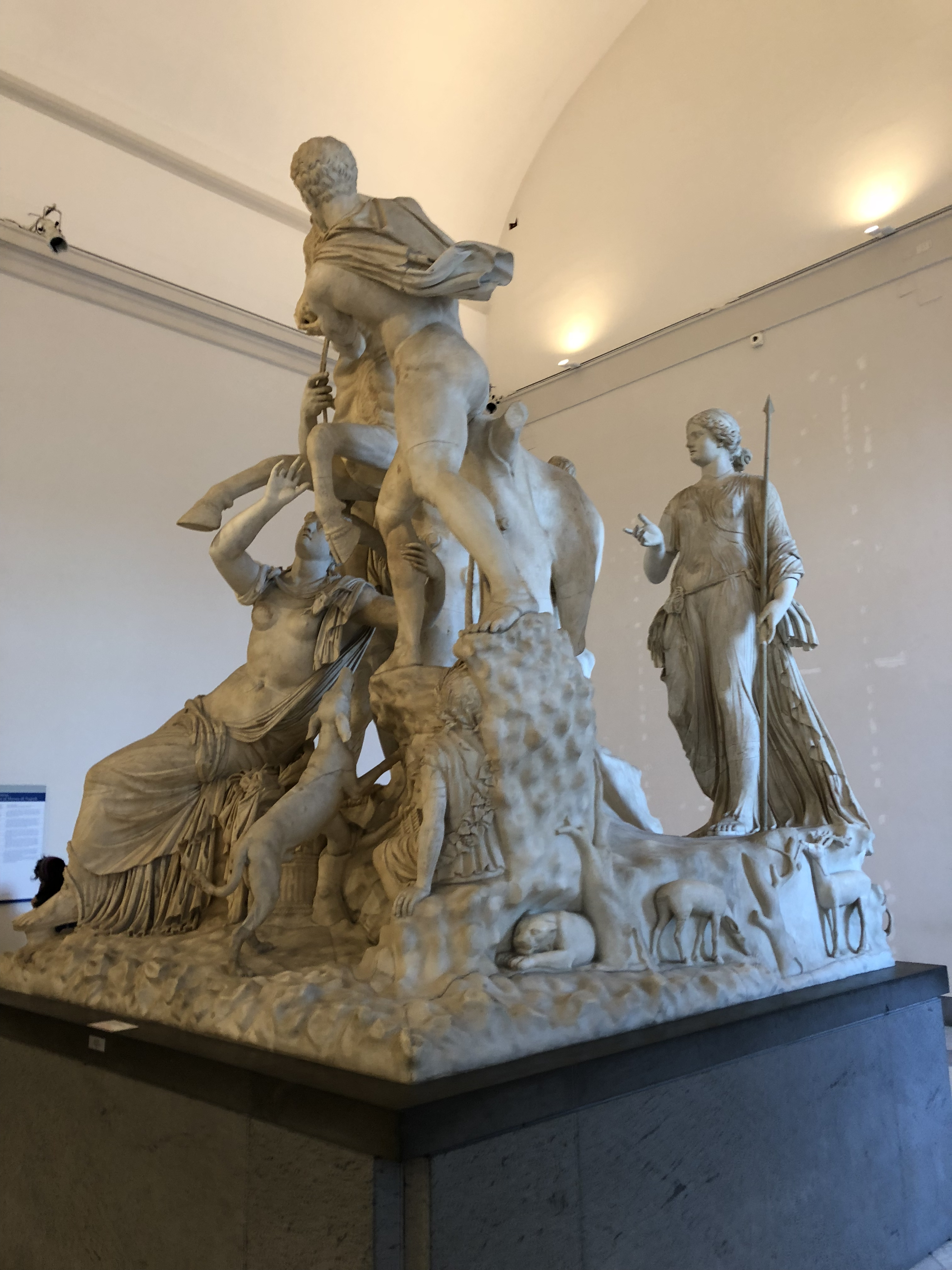
View showing the standing figure of Antiope that is obscured in typical photographs of the sculpture

The group underwent a substantial restoration in the sixteenth century, when Michelangelo planned to use it for a fountain to be installed at the centre of a garden between Palazzo Farnese and the Villa Farnesina. It also may have been adapted for this use soon after it was found, which is supported by descriptions from the Renaissance era.

Further restorations were made in the eighteenth and nineteenth centuries. In 1883, the original sculpture was noted by Domenico Monaco, curator of the (then) National Museum in Naples, to have been carved from a block of marble measuring 3.66 m × 2.75 m (12.0 ft × 9.0 ft); after its restorations, the work's perimeter is approximately 3.3 metres (10 ft 10 in) on each side and more than 4 m (13 ft 1 in) high. As it is today, the sculpture weighs 21.8 tonnes (24 short tons).

It has been argued that the Farnese Bull could not be the sculpture noted by Pliny in his Natural History, but rather that it is a third-century AD Roman version made specifically for Caracalla's Baths. Other scholars dispute this, arguing that since the Farnese Bull was originally located in the nearby Horti Asiniani (or Asiniani gardens) that the Pollio family owned, to have commissioned a copy specifically for the Baths would have meant both pieces would have been displayed in very close proximity.

The sculpture is shown in the 1954 film Journey to Italy along with the Farnese Hercules. Henry Peacham, in The Compleat Gentleman, says that it "out-strippeth all other Statues in the world for greatnesse and workemanship".

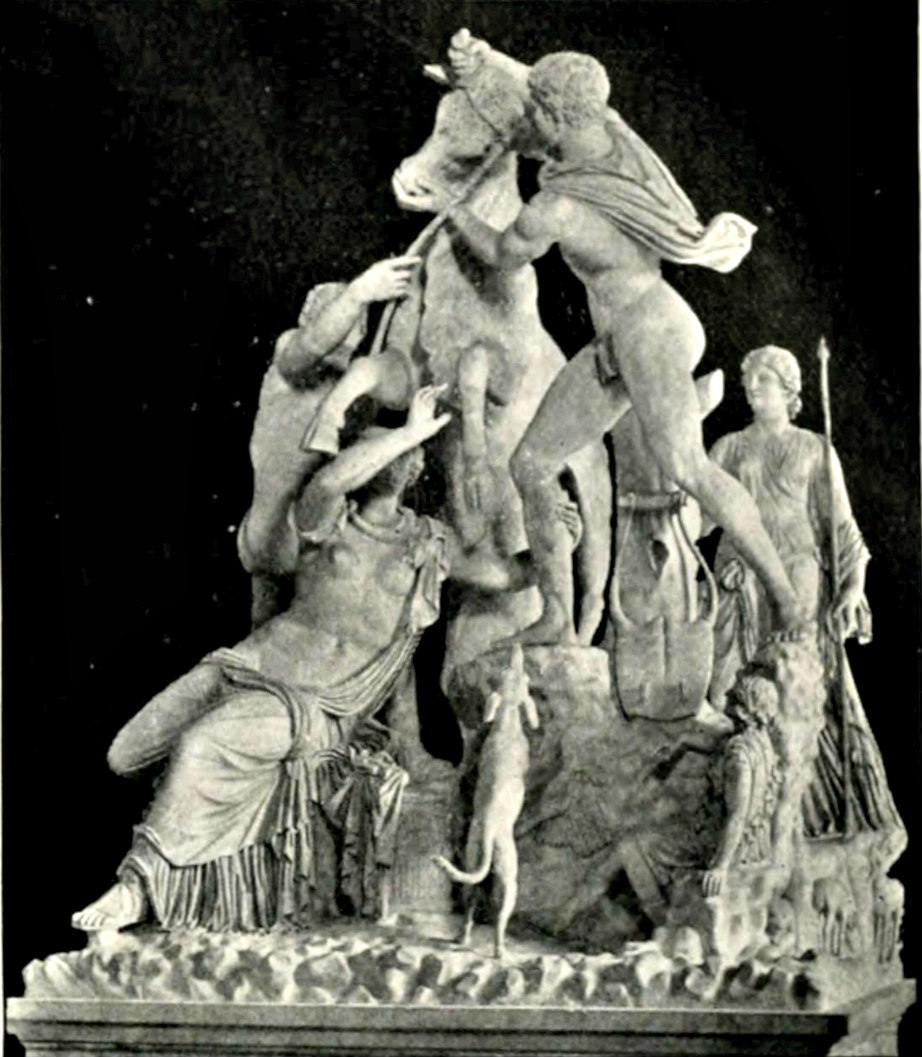
The Farnese Bull as it was depicted in the Encyclopædia Britannica (11th ed.), v. 12, 1911, Plate I, between pp. 480 and 481 (or pp. 472 and 473 depending on edition), Fig. 51.

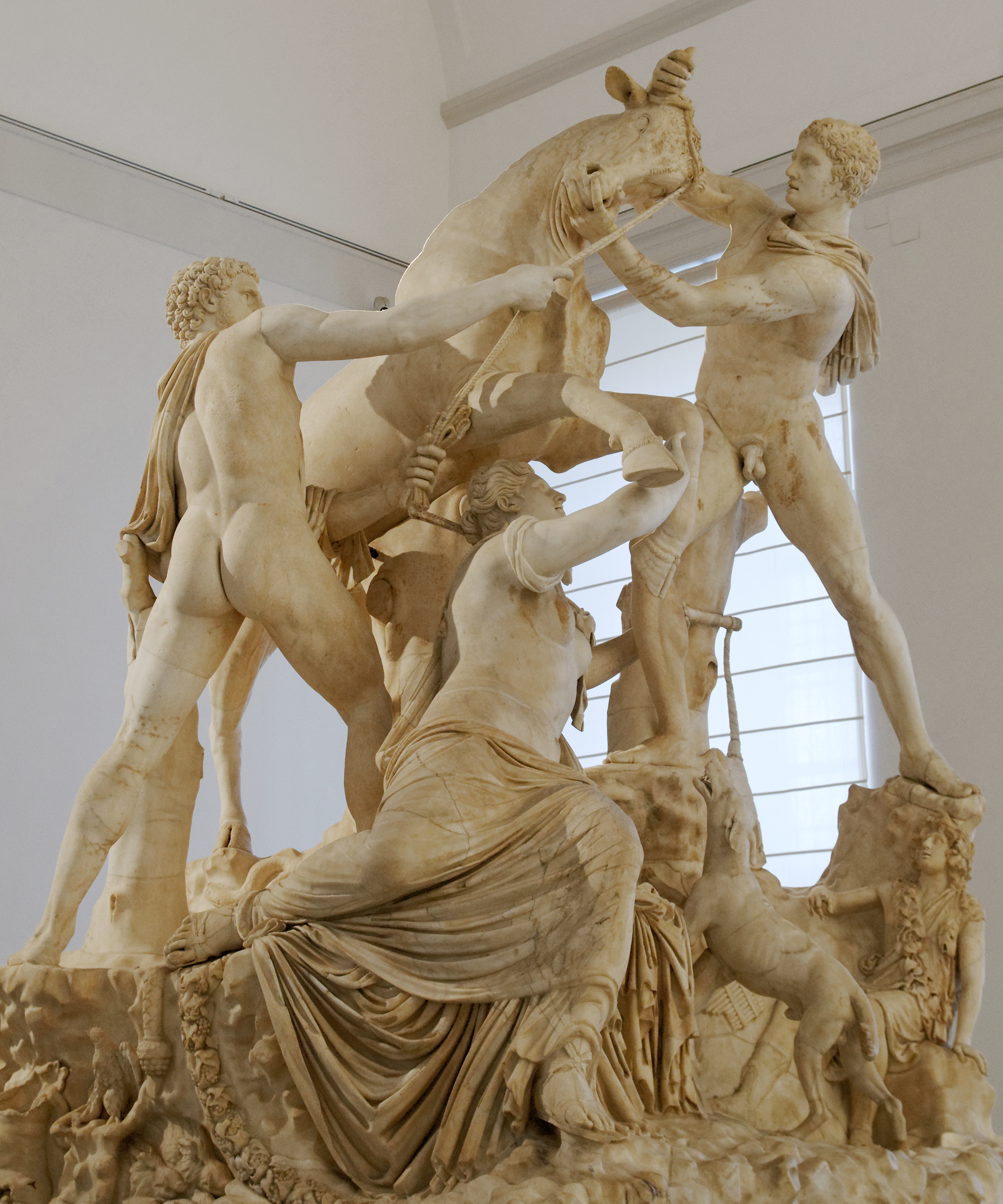
An oblique front view of the Farnese Bull - note that lighting greatly affects the appearance of the marble.

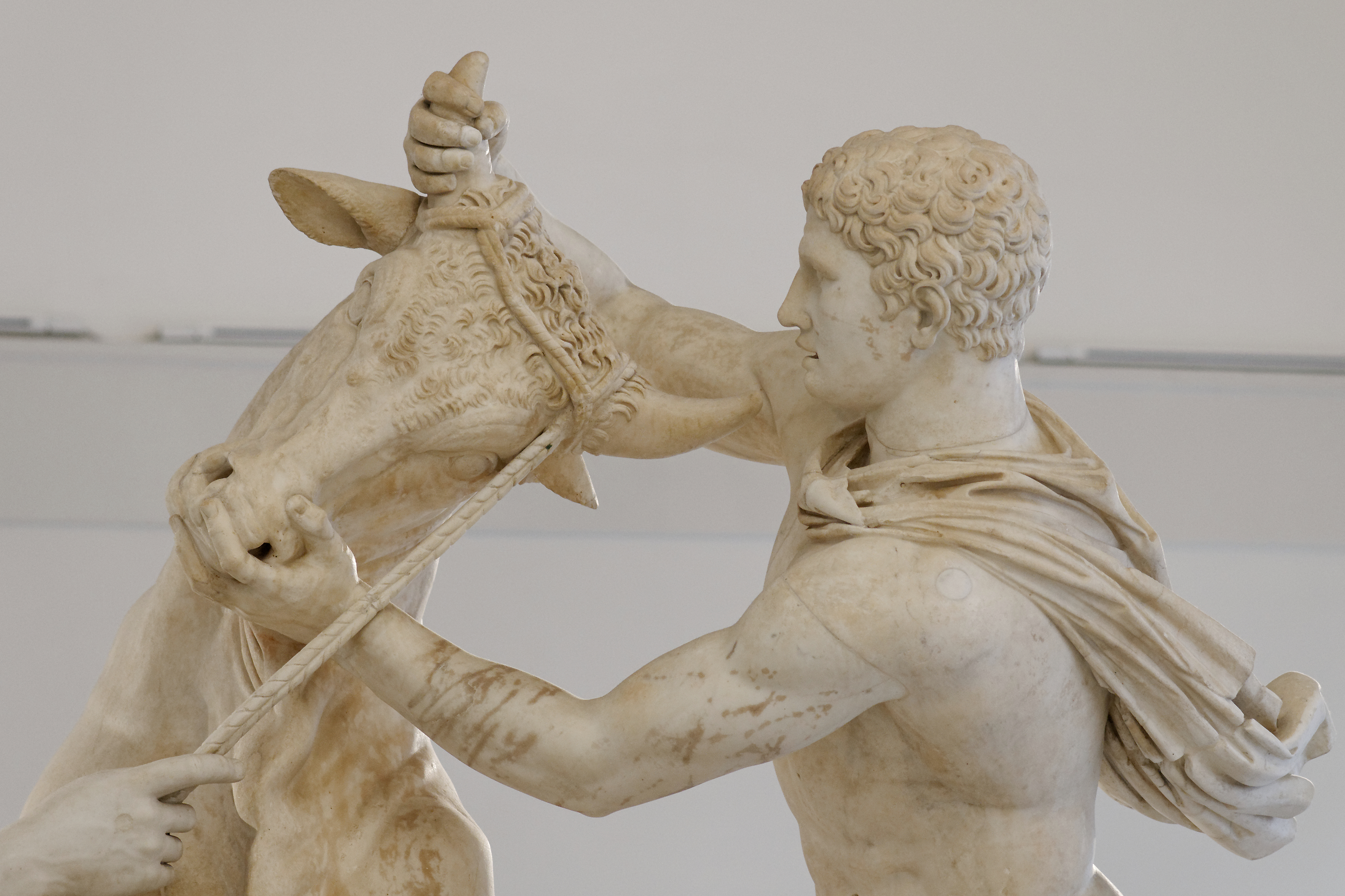
A detail view of the bull's head and the male figure holding it by the horns.

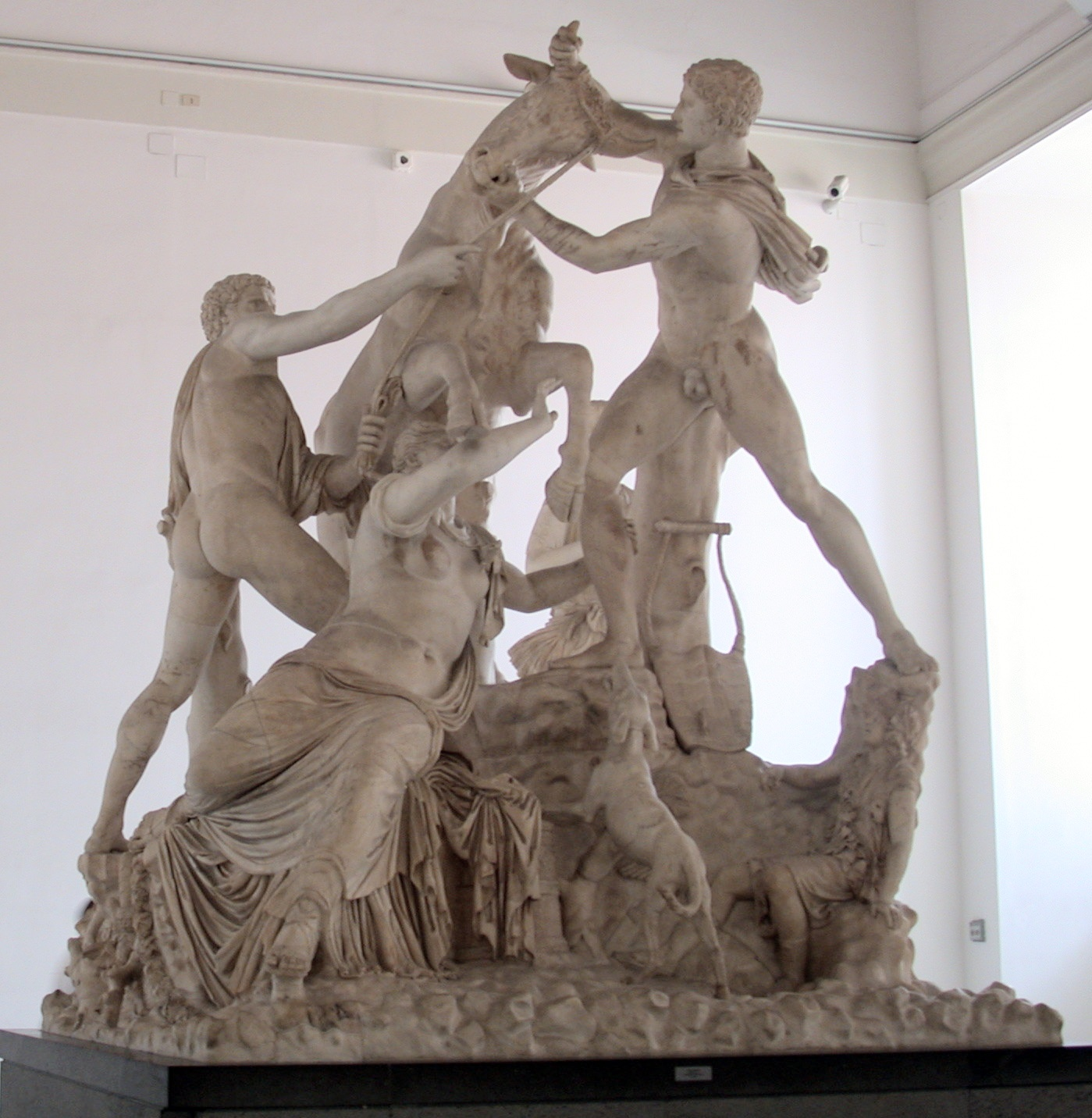
Front view, taken largely in natural light.

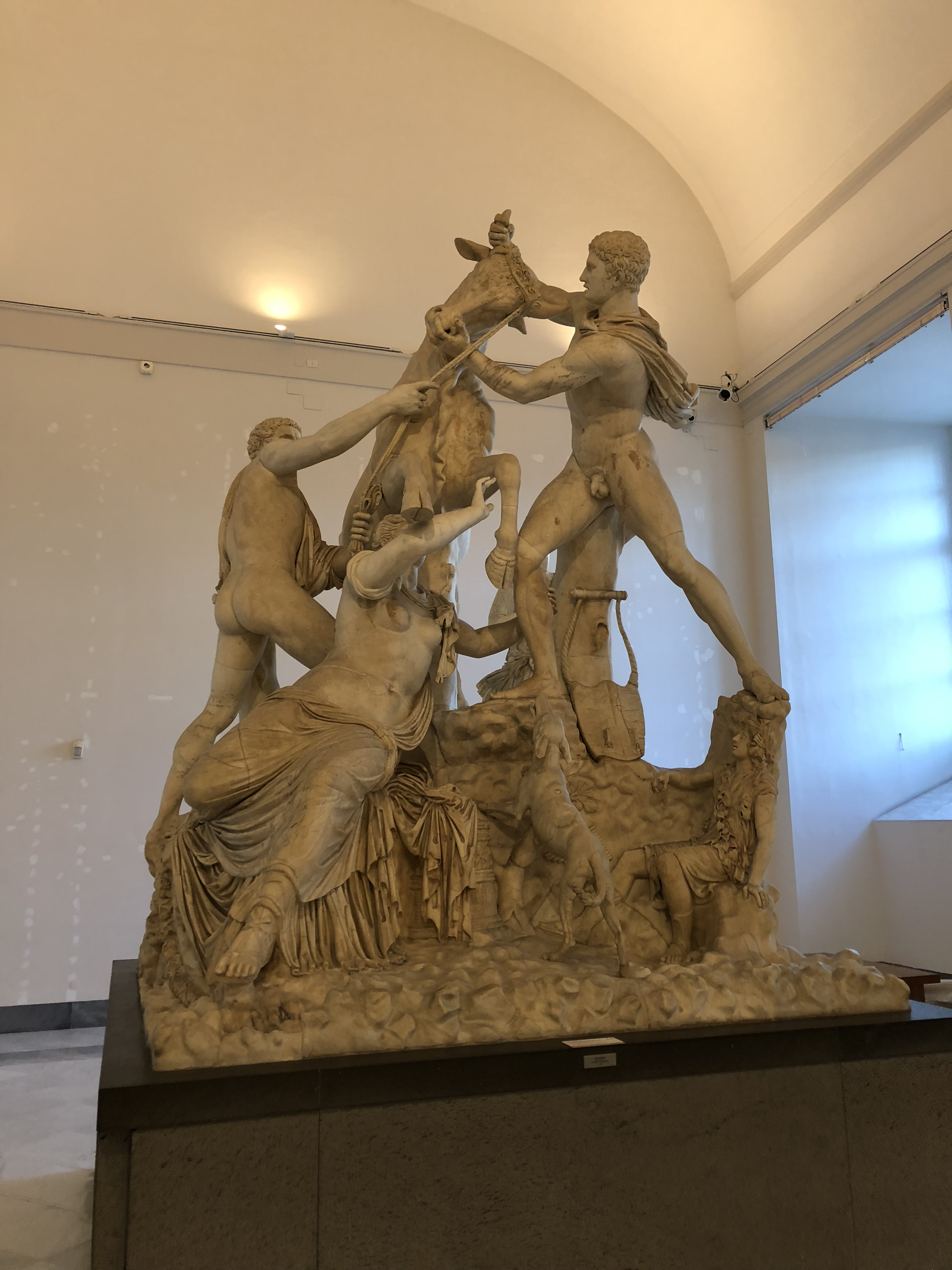
A front view, taken primarily using artificial light.

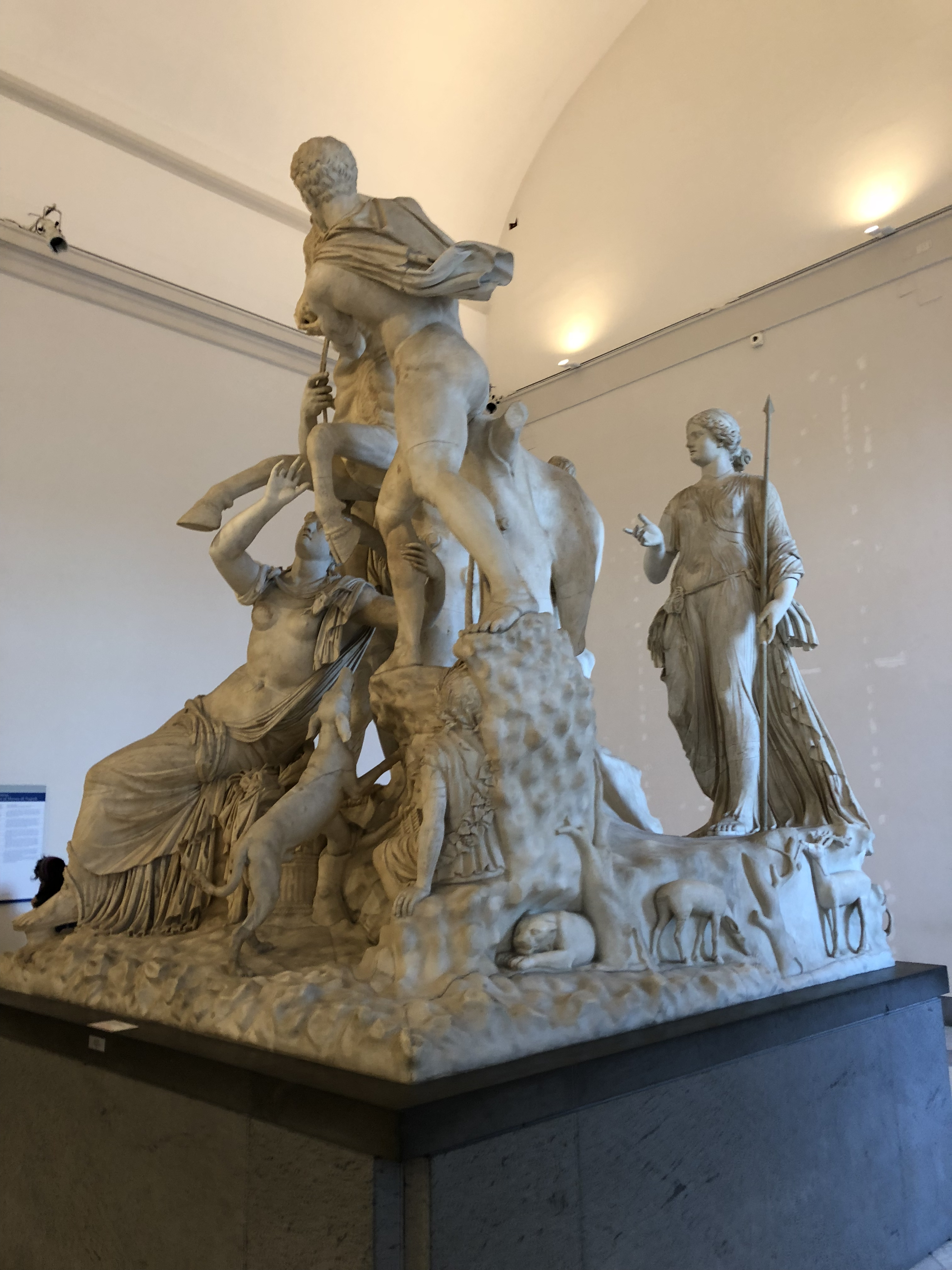
A side view showing a standing figure of Antiope that is obscured when the piece is viewed from the front.

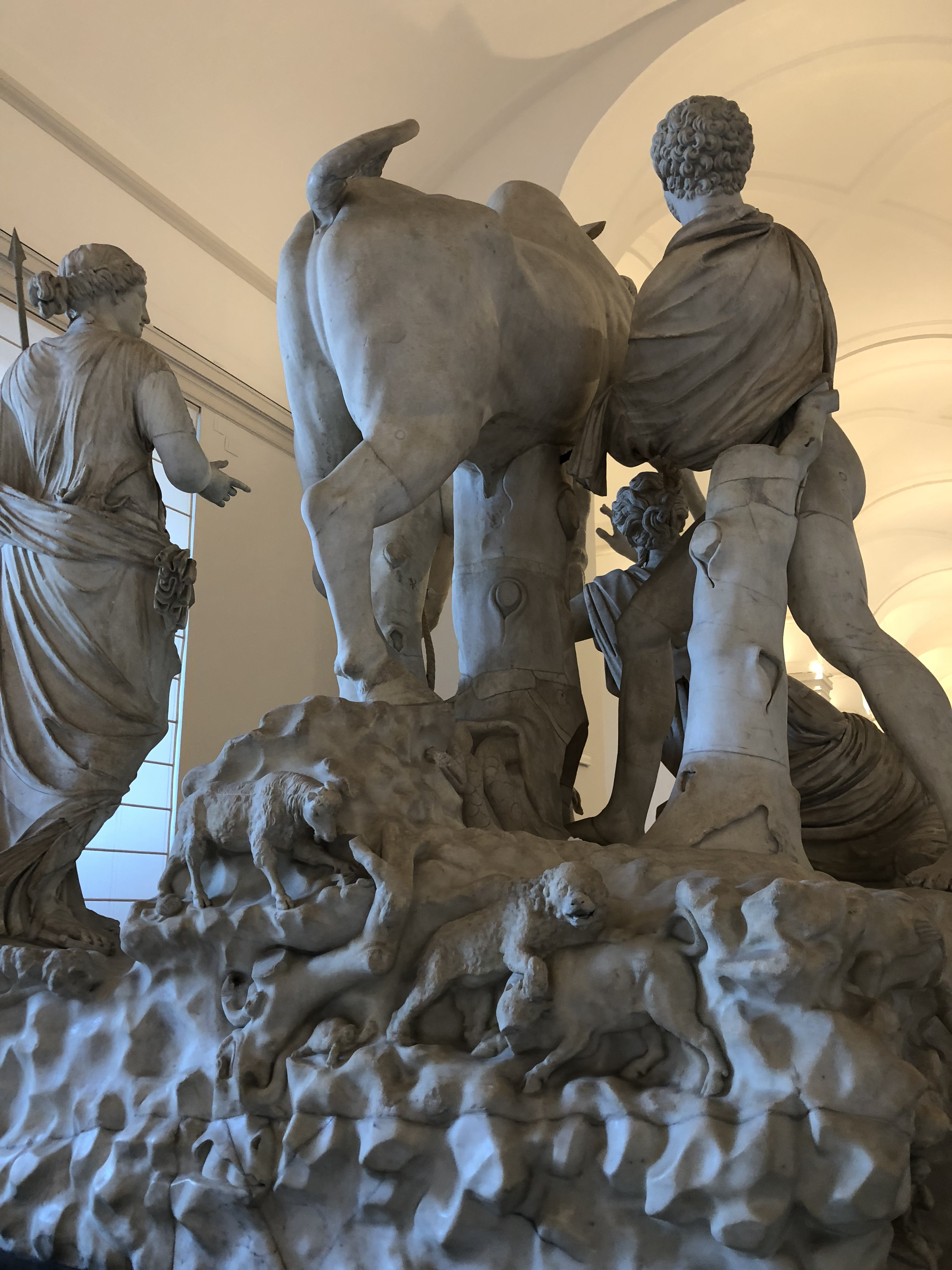
A back view, showing further detail in the base, support for one of the male figures, and the standing figure of Antiope.

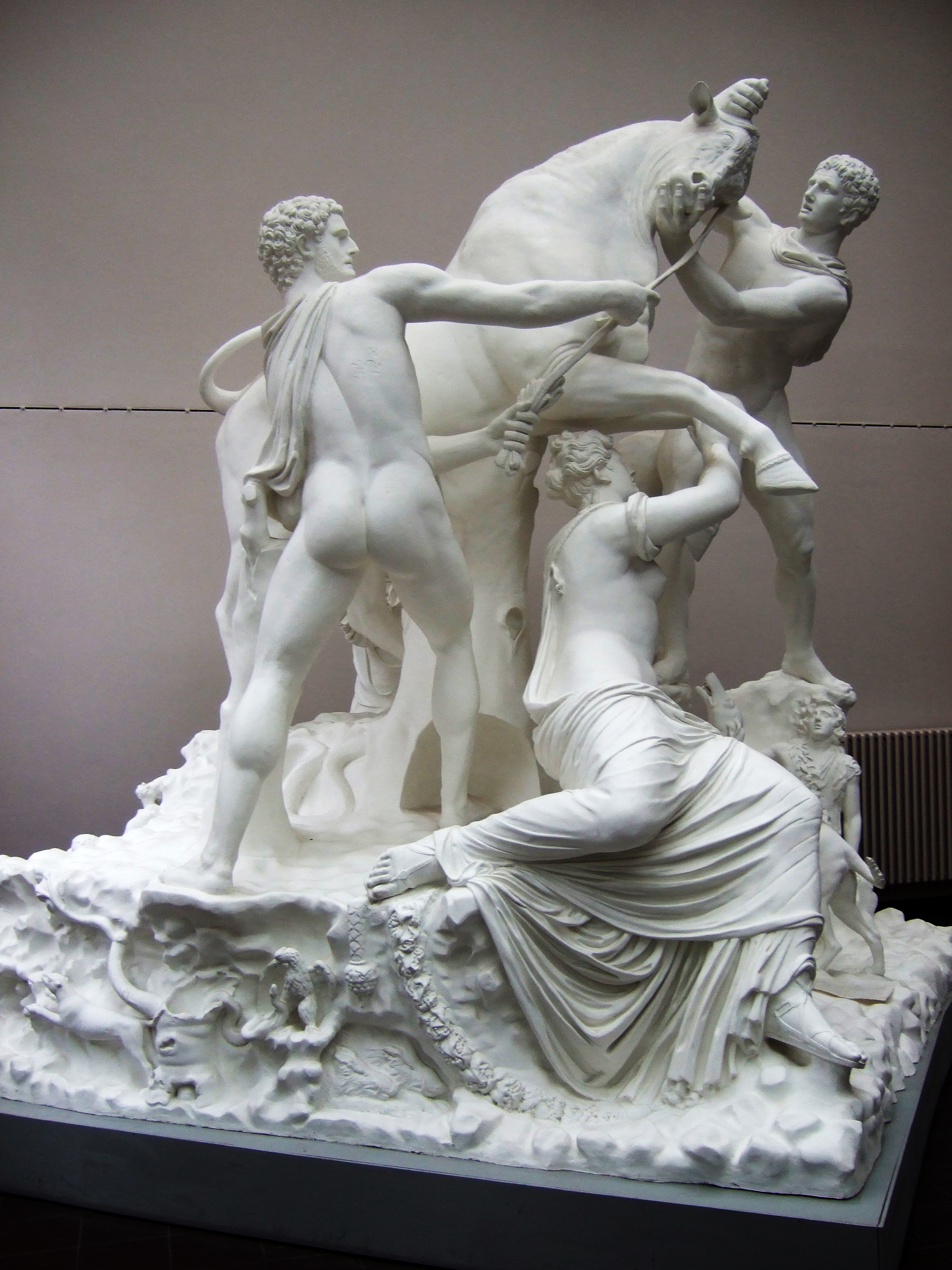
Plaster cast of the Farnese Bull in the Gipsformerei, Berlin-Charlottenburg, Germany
