= Farnese Cup =

Egyptian drinking dish from 2nd-century BC

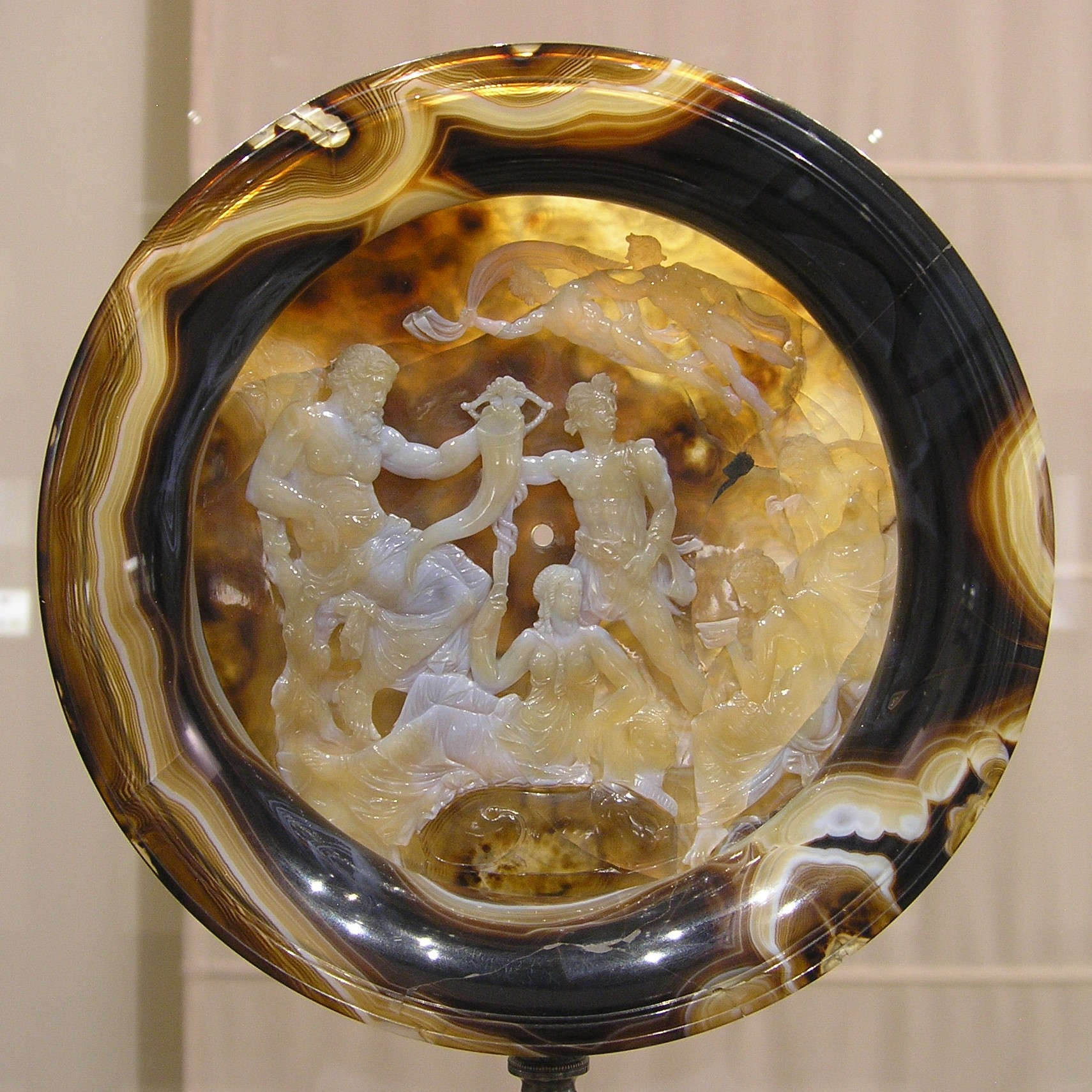
Tazza Farnese (front)

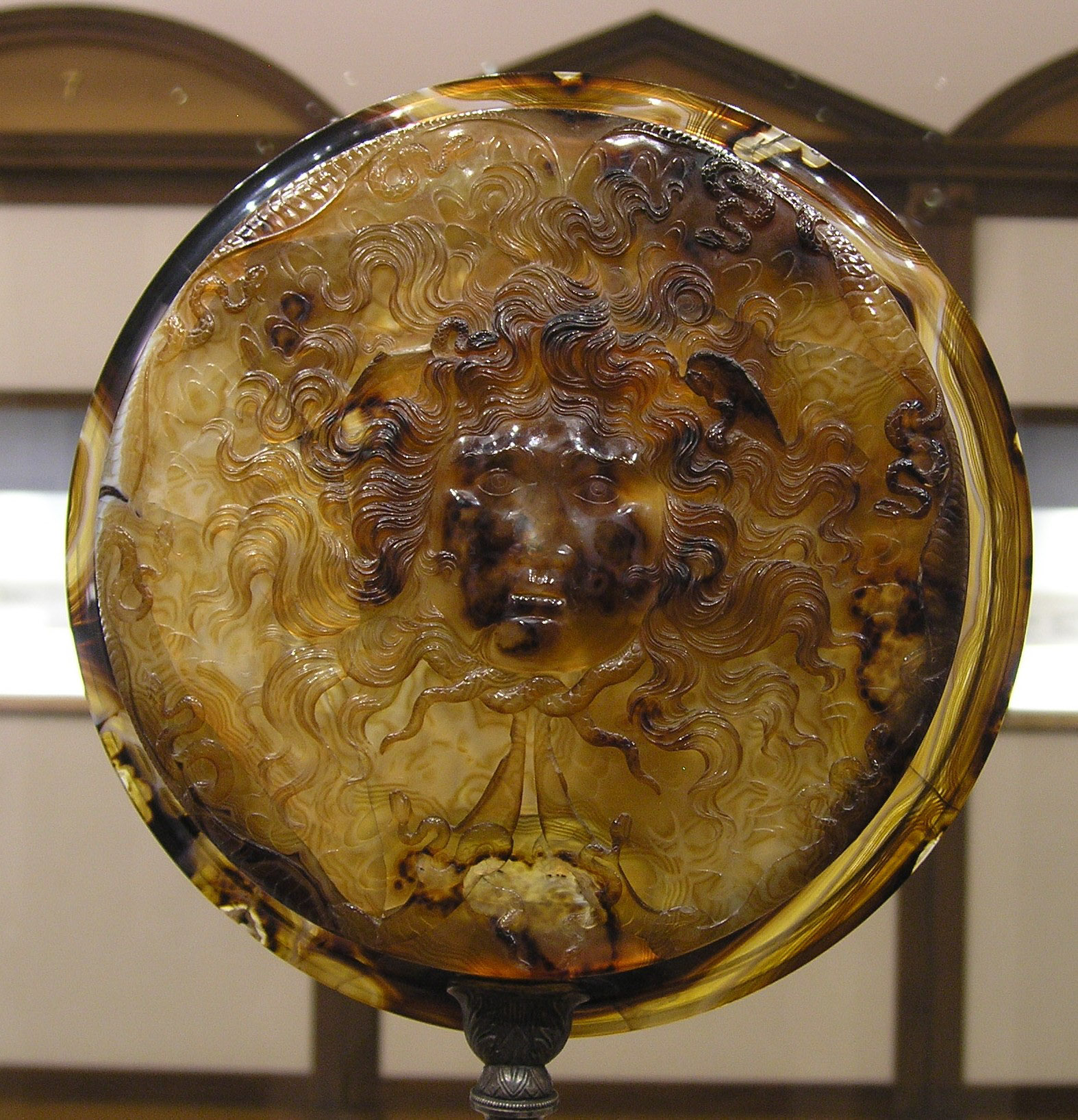
Tazza Farnese Gorgoneion (back)

The Farnese Cup or Tazza Farnese is a 2nd or 1st-century BC cameo hardstone carving bowl or cup made in Hellenistic Egypt of four-layered sardonyx agate. It is at the Naples National Archaeological Museum. It is about 20 cm (8 in) wide and similar in form to a Greek phiale or Roman patera, with no foot. It features relief carvings on both its exterior and interior surfaces.

There is no surviving evidence regarding when and why the piece was made, though there is consensus among scholars that it was created in Alexandria, due to the blending of Ancient Egyptian and Ancient Greek or Roman iconography found in its relief carvings. This provides a range of time wherein it may have been created, spanning from approximately 300 BC to 20 BC.

The underside has a large Gorgon's head occupying most of the area, probably intended to ward off evil. The upper side has a scene with several figures that has long puzzled scholars. It seems clearly an allegory containing several divine figures and perhaps personifications, but corresponds to no other known representation and has been interpreted in several different ways.

== History ==
The origin of the Tazza Farnese is unknown, leaving archaeologists and art historians to theorize a date and purpose for its creation. While its size and the material used are usually considered, theories of origin are mainly arrived at via individual analysis of the iconography of the piece, and therefore vary from one analysis to the next.

Many archaeologists and art historians attribute the Tazza to the Hellenistic Period, asserting that its blending of Greek and Egyptian cultural symbols, as well as the funds necessary to commission such a large gemstone cameo, tie it to the Ptolemaic court. Though not a widely held view, more recent analyses of the piece have assigned it a later date in the Augustan Period.

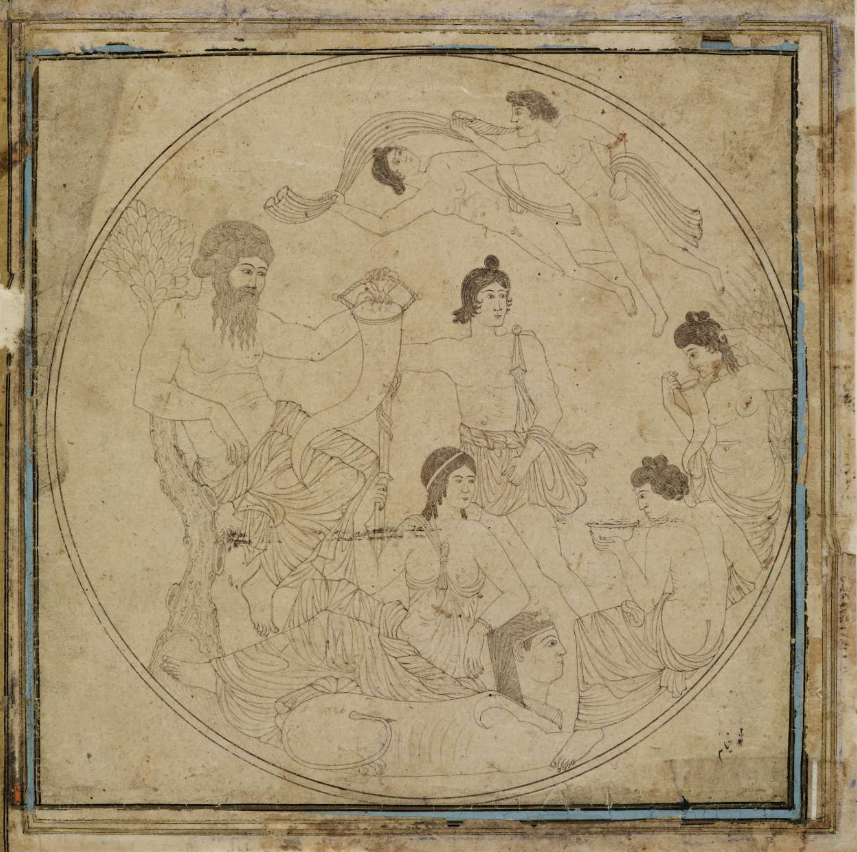
15th-century Persian drawing of the cup

After Octavian's conquest of Egypt in 31 BC, the Farnese Cup was possibly acquired by the Treasury of Rome; according to some, it was only made after the Romans took Egypt. It seems it was later taken to Byzantium, then back west after this city was sacked in 1204 during the Fourth Crusade. By 1239 it was in the court of Frederick II, from which it then reached the Persian court of Herat or possibly Samarkand, where a contemporary drawing documents it; thence it found its way to the court of Alfonso of Aragon in Naples, where Angelo Poliziano saw it in 1458. Lorenzo the Magnificent finally purchased the famous "scutella di calcedonio" in Rome, in 1471. From there it came into the possession of the Farnese family through Margaret of Austria and thus into the Naples National Archaeological Museum

== Iconography ==
Though some analyses of the iconography of the Tazza Farnese build upon and expand previous analyses, each scholarly writing on the piece leads to a slightly different theory about its inherent meaning.

=== Eugene J. Dwyer ===
In his analysis of the Tazza Farnese, Dwyer builds upon previous analyses by experts in the field, including Ennio Quirino Visconti, Frederic Louis Bastet, and Reinhold Merkelbach, among others. Dwyer's two major assertions are that the iconography found in the interior and exterior carvings is a sophisticated mix of Greek and Egyptian philosophic and religious concepts and that the composition of the carved figures correspond to specific constellations which, in their orientation, resemble a map of the night sky during the time of year in which the flooding of the Nile would have occurred. In assigning the piece a multi-faceted religious and philosophic meaning, Dwyer repeatedly references the Corpus Hermeticum. More specifically, he points to the Poimandres and how the figures of the interior carving closely match the elements it presents in its discussion of the creation of life. He uses this reference to assign each figure a corresponding Greek and/or Egyptian god. In this sense, Dwyer sets up the piece as a direct illustration of the creation of life that would have been easily understood by both Greeks and Egyptians living at the time the Tazza was created. Though he credits Merkelbach with first coming up with the theory, Dwyer also discusses the figures' and their placement on the piece as corresponding to specific constellations in an astronomical map. In particular, Dwyer assigns each figure to constellations that would be seen together in the sky during the time of year when the flooding of the Nile took place. He argues that through this apparent map of the night sky, the creator of the Tazza was directly referencing the time of the Nile flooding in order to present more fully the concept of divine creation of life.

=== Julia C. Fischer ===
Profile view

Fischer is one of the few who have assigned the Tazza Farnese an Augustan date rather than a Hellenistic one. Her analysis of the piece therefore focuses on reexamining preconceived notions arrived at by other scholars who have assigned it a Hellenistic date, as well as attempting to provide evidence for her assertion of an Augustan date. Fischer's main evidence for placing the piece in the Augustan period is its size and the material it was carved from. She discusses the unstable economic position of the Ptolemaic Court, asserting that the funds for such a piece would not have been available until the improvement of the economy during the Augustan period. Fischer also discusses that while the piece features a mix of Greek and Egyptian figures, concepts, and methods, it also contains distinctly Roman aspects, especially in the Romanesque features of the Gorgon carving found on the piece's exterior. She believes that the cup was created for propaganda purposes in response to the Aquileia Dish.

=== John Pollini ===
Like Julia C. Fischer, John Pollini attributes the Tazza Farnese to the Augustan period in Rome. His evidence is also based on the size and material used, but Pollini's primary focus is providing analysis of the piece's iconography in an attempt to prove that it was made during Augustus' reign, and was possibly even commissioned by Augustus himself. To this end, Pollini discusses the figures carved on the inner and outer surfaces, and how the symbolism found in each relates it to an aspect or region of the Augustan empire. Pollini's interpretation of the piece's iconography leads him to assert that it was meant to convey the Golden Age of Augustus and act as a sort of talisman to propagate the strength of the empire.
