= Kritios Boy =

Ancient Greek sculpture from the Acropolis of Athens

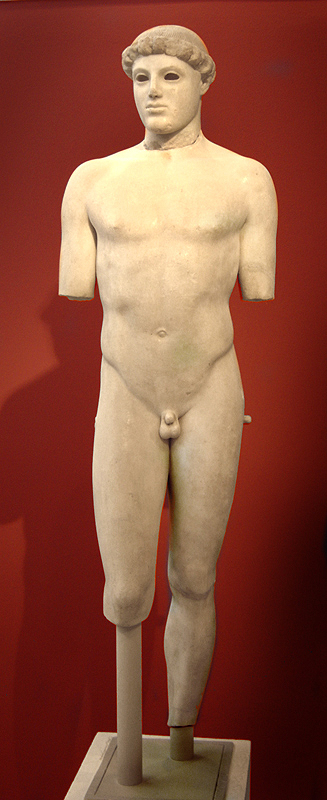
- Material: Parian marble
- Created: c. 480 BC
- Period/culture: Late Archaic/early classical
- Discovered: 1865, 1888; Athens, Attica, Greece
- Place: Acropolis Museum, Athens
- Culture: Classical Greece

The marble Kritios Boy or Kritian Boy belongs to the Early Classical period of ancient Greek sculpture. It is the first statue from classical antiquity known to use contrapposto; Kenneth Clark called it "the first beautiful nude in art" The Kritios Boy is thus named because it is attributed, on slender evidence, to Kritios, who worked together with Nesiotes (sculptors of Harmodius and Aristogeiton) or their school, from around 480 BC. As currently mounted, the statue is considerably smaller than life-size at 117 cm (3 ft 10 ins), including the supports that replace the missing feet.

== Discovery ==
The statue was excavated on the Acropolis of Athens, among the "Perserschutt", the ceremonial dump in which the Athenians buried the debris of sacred artefacts destroyed by the marauding Persian army in 480 BC. It is on display in the Acropolis Museum, Athens, near the site where it was excavated. The torso was found in 1865 while excavating the foundation of the old museum on the Athenian Acropolis. The head of this statue was found twenty-three years later between the museum and the Acropolis south wall, in the latest stage of the rubble of destruction undergone in the Persian Wars. This fact, in conjunction with the analysis of its style, is essential to the dating of the statue.

== Significance ==
Whether or not Kritios was the innovator, with the Kritios Boy (ephebos) the Greek artist has mastered a complete understanding of how the different parts of the body act as a system. The statue moves away from the rigid and stiff pose of the Archaic style. Kritios Boy presents a more relaxed and naturalistic pose known as contrapposto. This stance forces a chain of anatomical events: as the pelvis is pushed diagonally upwards on the left side, the right buttock relaxes, the spine acquires an "S" curve, and the shoulder line dips on the left to counteract the action of the pelvis.

Among classical Greek sculptures, the Kritios Boy expresses a set of proportions known as the "Canon of Polyclitus". It set the rule for later sculptors like Praxiteles and Lysippos, whose contrapposto, or ponderation, is more emphasised than the "subtle equilibrium of outline and axis which is to be the basis of classical art" exhibited by the Kritios Boy's "delicate balance of movement" It is possible that earlier bronze statues had used contraposty, but have not survived. Susan Woodford has speculated that the statue is a copy of a bronze original.

The Kritios Boy exhibits a number of other critical innovations that distinguish it from the Archaic Kouroi from the seventh and sixth century BC that paved its way. The Archaic style relied more on geometrical shapes to define the contours of the human body. The muscular and skeletal structure of Kritios Boy are depicted with unforced lifelike accuracy of flesh and bone, with the rib cage naturally expanded as if in the act of breathing, with a relaxed attitude and hips which are distinctly narrower. Sculptors had begun to break away from the rules of the Archaic style and follow representation that was closer to nature. As a final forebear of the classical period, the archaic smile has been completely replaced by the accurate rendering of the lips and the austere expression that characterized the transitional Severe style. It was created in same era as the Blond Kouros's Head of the Acropolis and the group of the "Tyrannicides" Harmodius and Aristogeiton. A good example for comparison is the marble statue of an ephebos in the museum in Agrigento.
