= National Archaeological Museum, Naples =

Museum in Naples

Coordinates: 40°51′13″N 14°15′02″E

Naples National Archaeological Museum
- Museo Archeologico Nazionale di Napoli
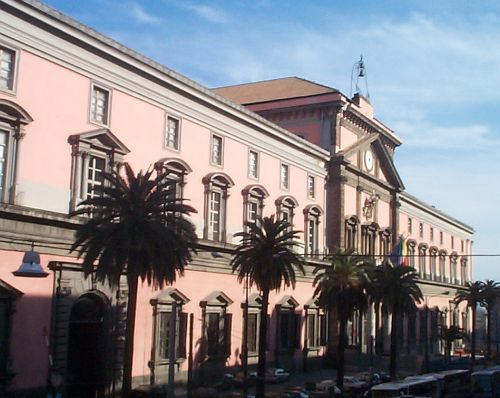
- Façade of the museum
- Established: 1777; 249 years ago
- Location: Piazza Museo 19, Naples, Italy
- Type: archaeology
- Collections: Roman, Greek, Egyptian
- Visitors: 500.000 (2017)
- Director: Paolo Giulierini
- Public transit access: Fermata Museo (Metropolitana linea 1); Fermata Piazza Cavour (Metropolitana linea 2)
- Website: Official website

The National Archaeological Museum of Naples (Italian: Museo Archeologico Nazionale di Napoli, abbr. MANN) is an Italian archaeological museum with a collection that includes works from Greek, Roman and Renaissance times, and especially Roman artifacts from the nearby Pompeii, Stabiae and Herculaneum sites. From 1816 to 1861, it was known as the Royal Bourbon Museum (Italian: Real Museo Borbonico).

== History ==
The building, dating to 1585, was originally a cavalry barracks. From 1616 to 1777, it was the seat of the University of Naples. During the 19th century, after it became a museum, the main structure underwent many renovations.

== Collections ==
The museum hosts extensive collections of Greek and Roman antiquities. Their core is from the Farnese Collection, which includes a collection of engraved gems (including the Farnese Cup, a Ptolemaic bowl made of sardonyx agate and the most famous piece in the "Treasure of the Magnificent", and is founded upon gems collected by Cosimo de' Medici and Lorenzo il Magnifico in the 15th century) and the Farnese Marbles. Among the notable works found in the museum are the Menologium Rusticum and the Herculaneum papyri, carbonized by the eruption of Mount Vesuvius, found after 1752 in Villa of the Papyri.

=== Marbles ===
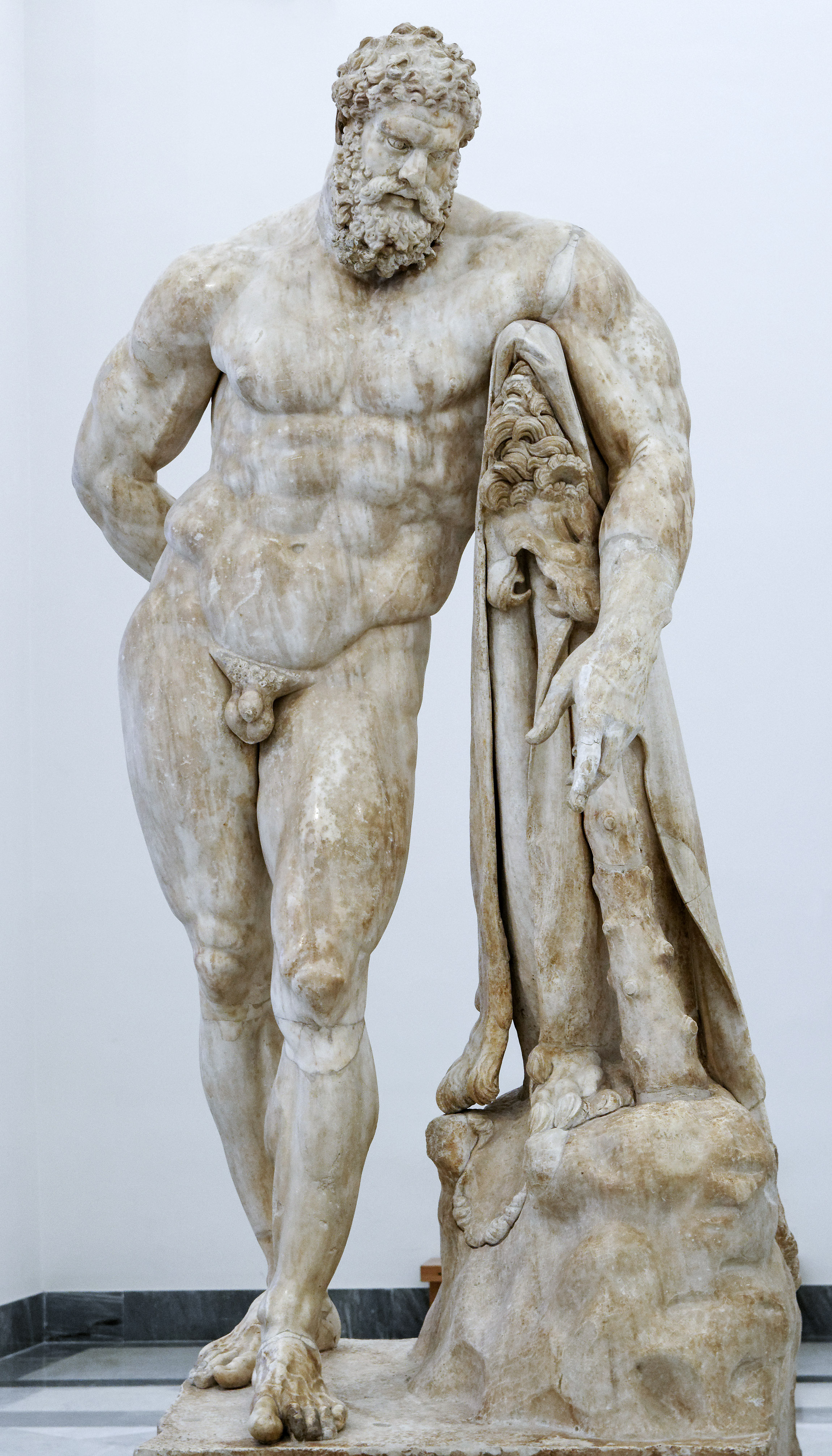
The Farnese Hercules

The greater part of the museum's classical sculpture collection largely comes from the Farnese Marbles, important since they include Roman copies of classical Greek sculpture, which are in many cases the only surviving indications of what the lost works by ancient Greek sculptors such as Calamis, Kritios and Nesiotes looked like. Many of these works, especially the larger ones, have been moved to the Museo di Capodimonte for display in recent years.

- The Farnese Hercules, which fixed the image of Hercules in the European imagination.
- The Farnese Atlas is the oldest extant depiction of Atlas from Greek mythology, and the oldest view of the Western constellations, possibly based upon the star catalog of Hipparchus
- The Farnese Bull, widely considered the largest single sculpture ever recovered from antiquity.
- The group Harmodius and Aristogeiton, a Roman copy of a bronze work that once stood in the Agora of Athens
- The Aphrodite Kallipygos
- The Farnese Artemis, again a Roman copy of a Greek original
- A collection of busts of Roman emperors
- Another set of Roman sculptures (again mainly copies of Greek work) that (like the Hercules) once stood in the Baths of Caracalla in Rome.

=== Bronzes from the Villa of the Papyri ===
A major collection of ancient Roman bronzes from the Villa of the Papyri is housed at the museum. These include the Seated Hermes, a sprawling Drunken Satyr, a bust of Thespis, another variously identified as Seneca or Hesiod, and a pair of exceptionally lively runners.

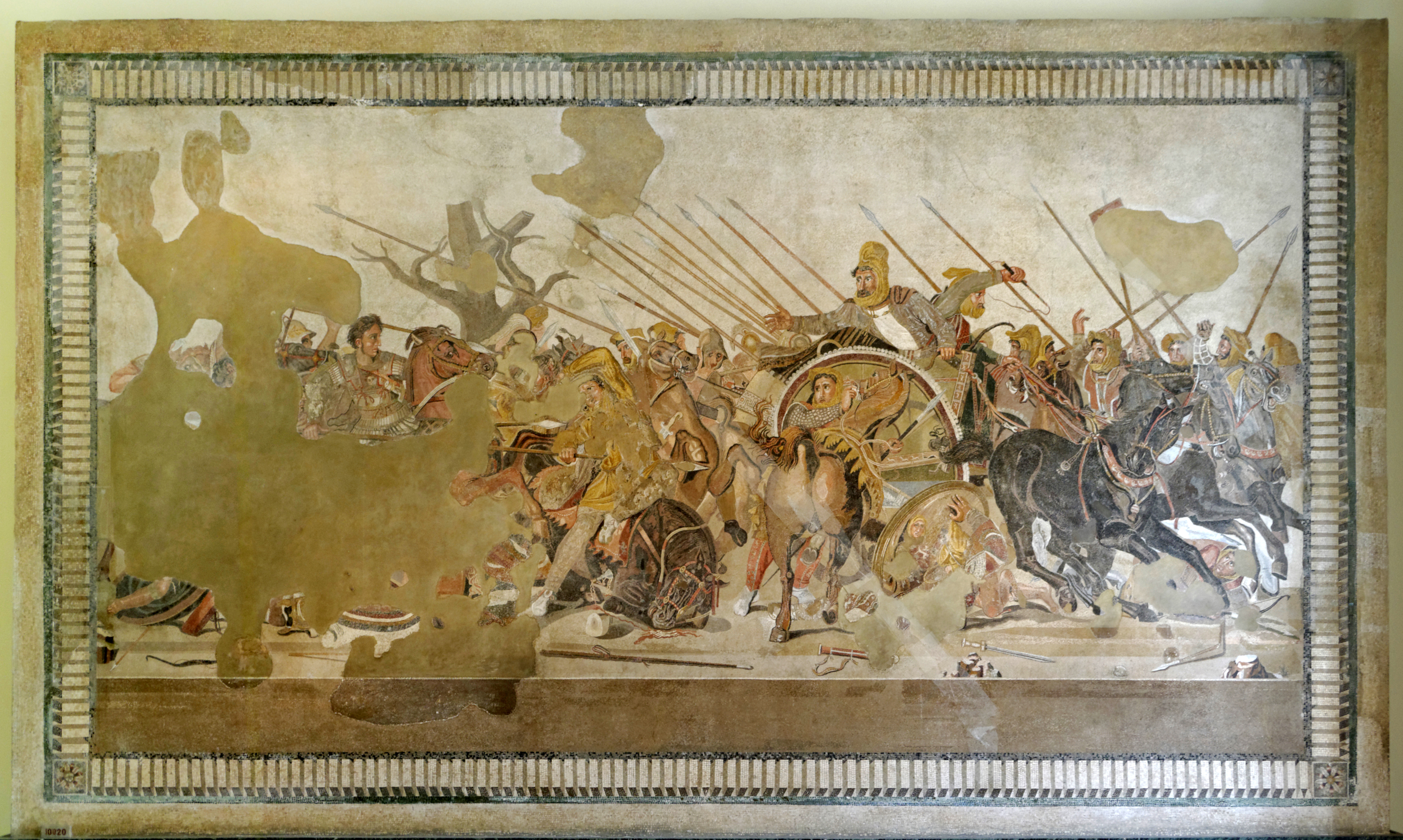
The Alexander Mosaic, portraying Alexander the Great

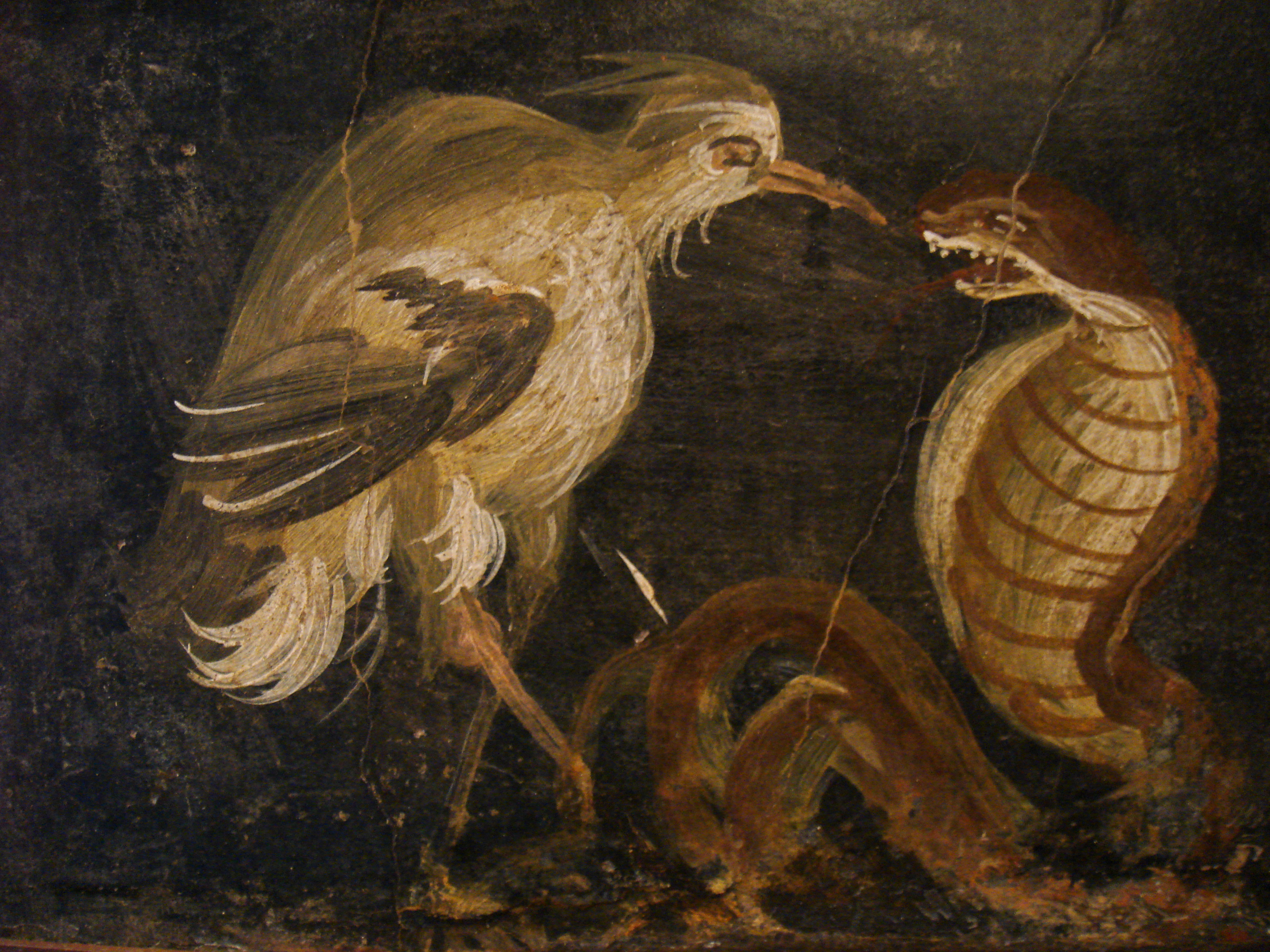
Heron and cobra. Ancient Roman fresco from House of Epigrammes, Pompeii (45–79 d.C.), Italy

=== Mosaics ===
The museum's Mosaic Collection includes a number of important mosaics recovered from the ruins of Pompeii and the other Vesuvian cities. This includes the Alexander Mosaic, dating from c. 100 BC, originally from the House of the Faun in Pompeii. It depicts a battle between the armies of Alexander the Great and Darius III of Persia. Another mosaic found is that of the gladiatorial fighter depicted in a mosaic found from the Villa of the Figured Capitals in Pompeii.

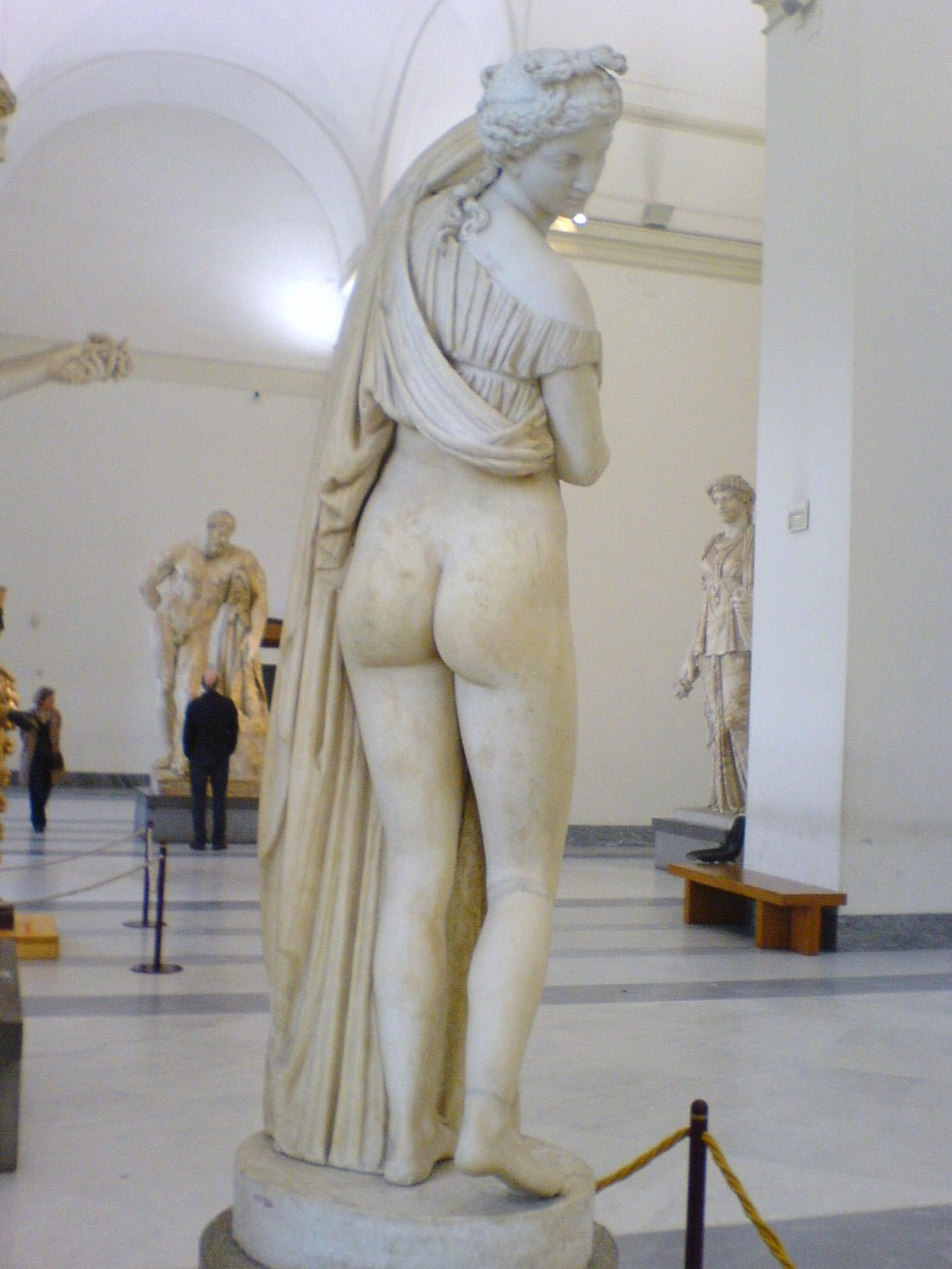
Aphrodite Kallipygos

=== Frescos ===
The museum houses a large collection of frescoes from Pompeii and Herculaneum.

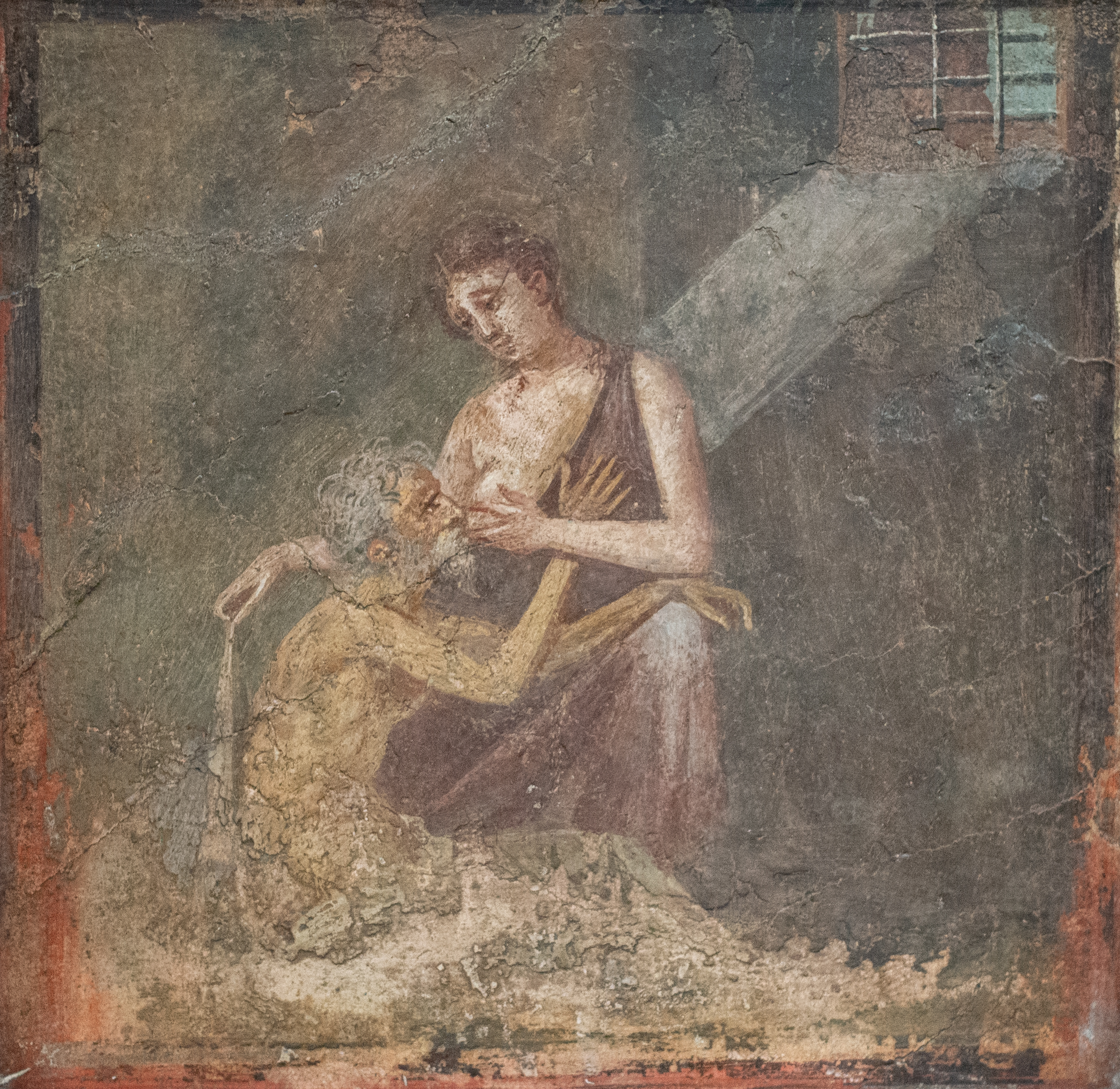
Cimon and Pero

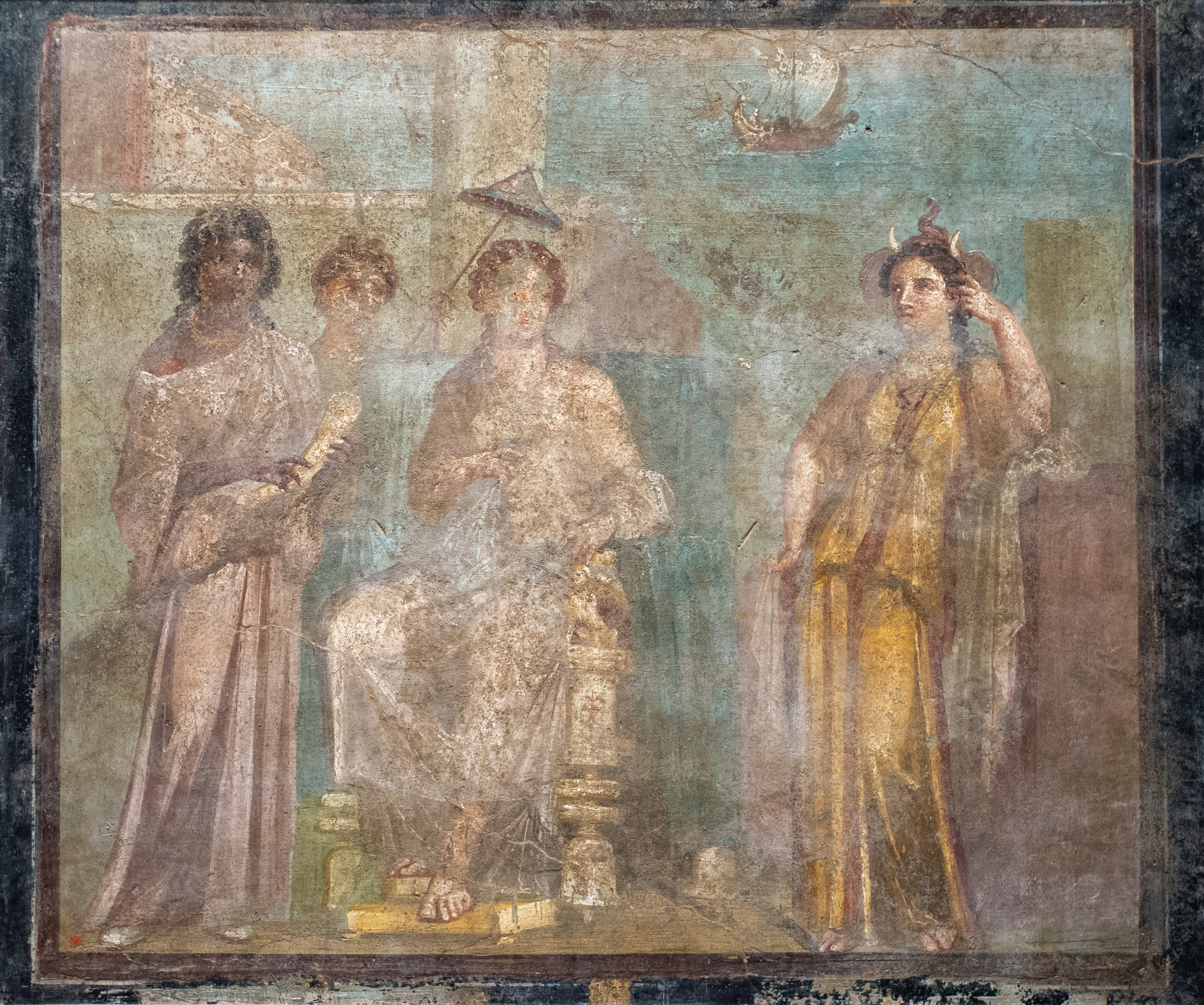
Dido abandoned

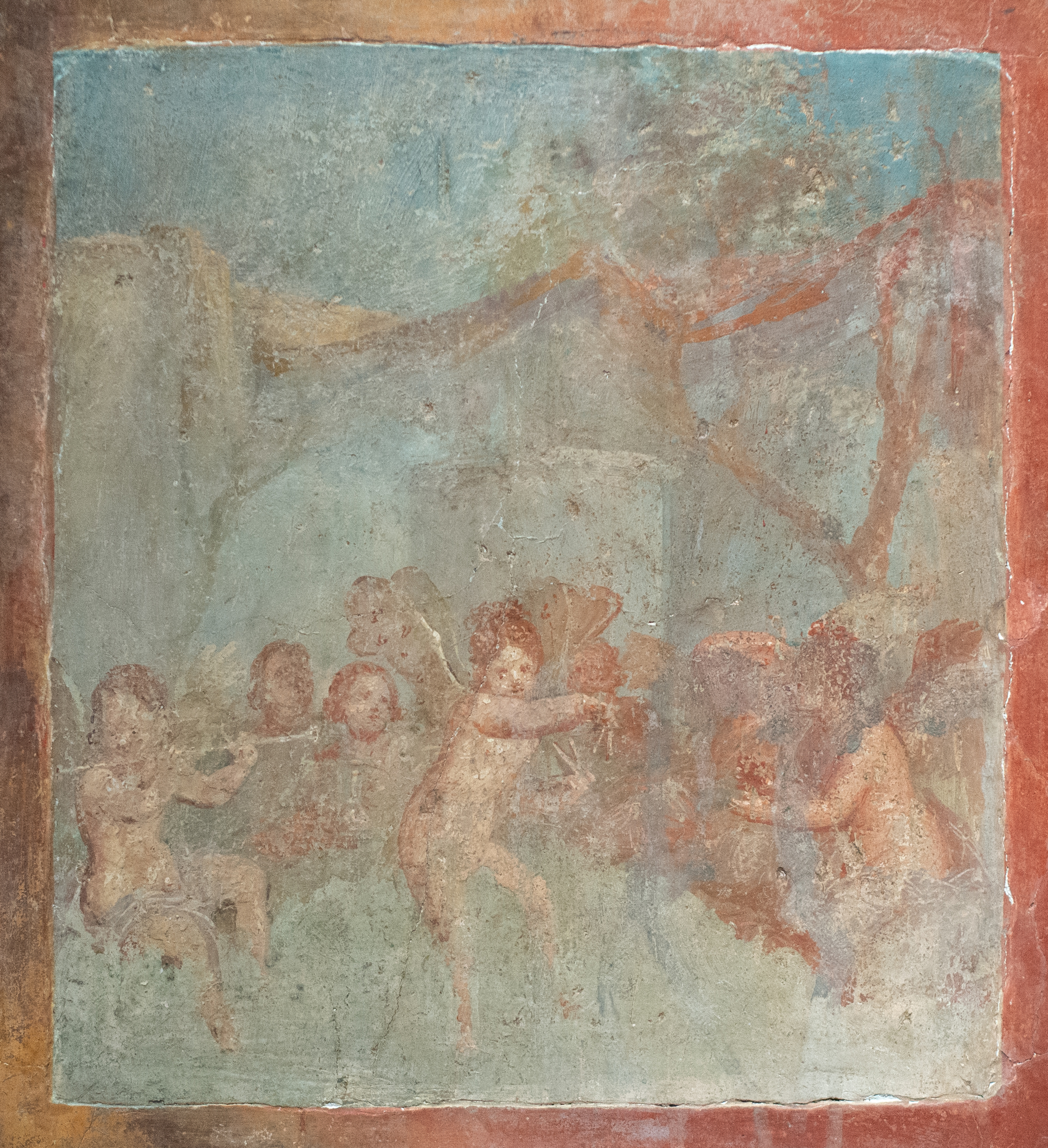
Dance of psyches

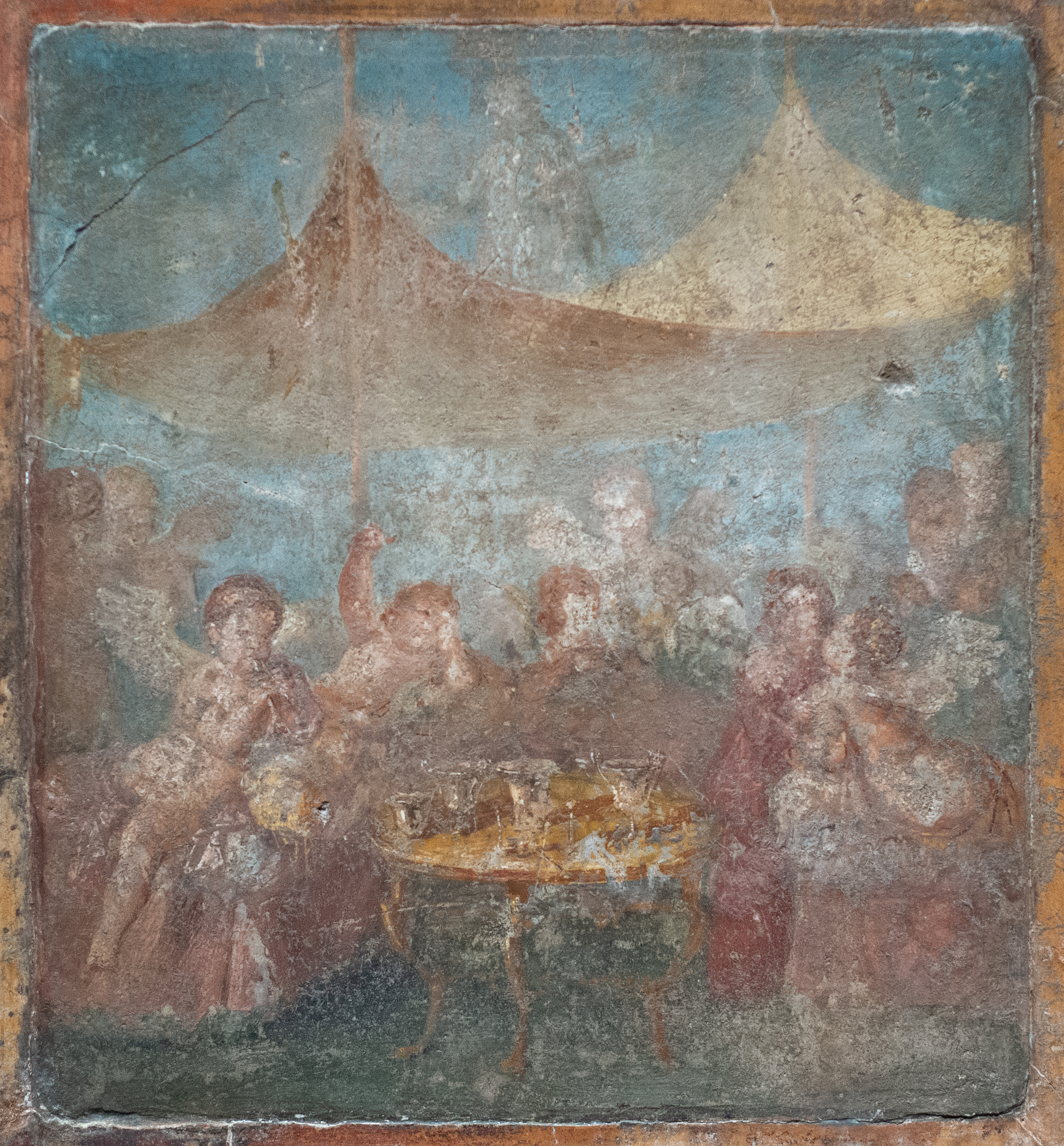
Symposium of Erotes

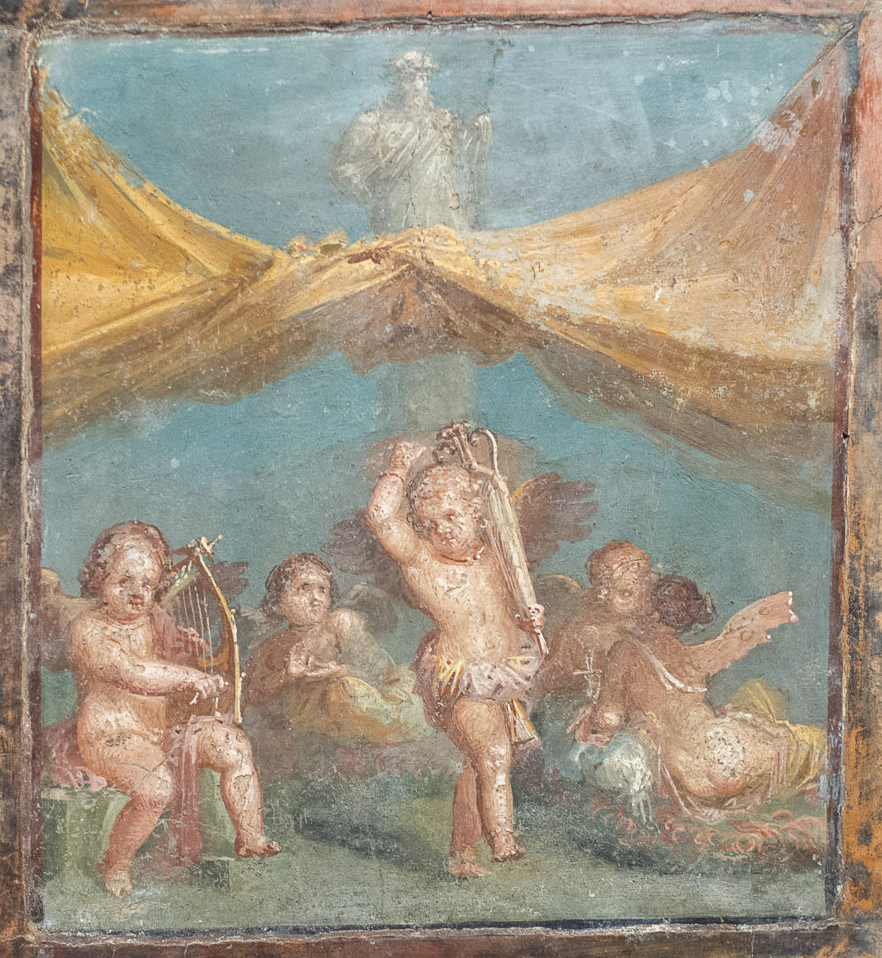
Symposium of Erotes

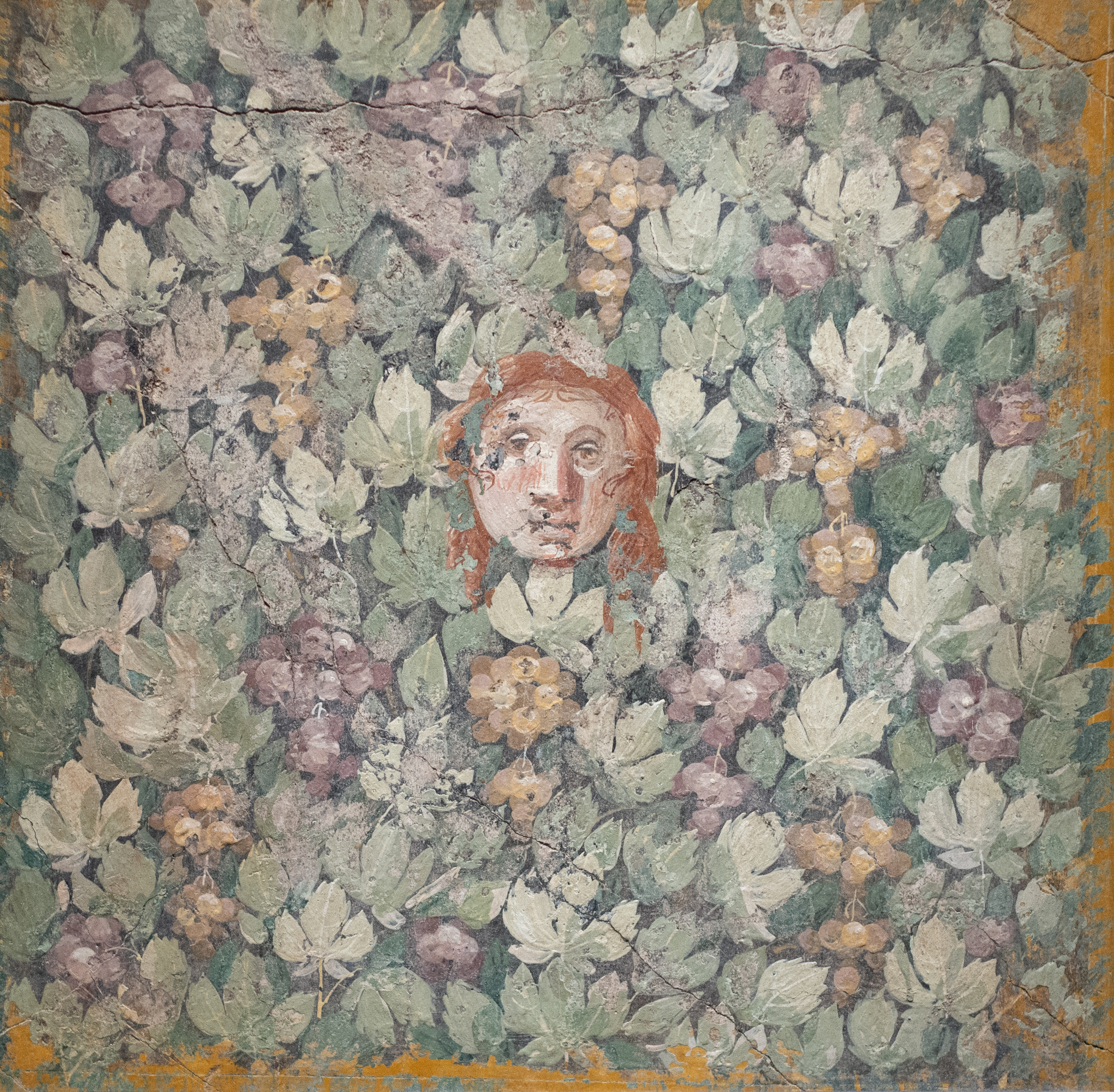
Mask amid bunches of grapes and vines

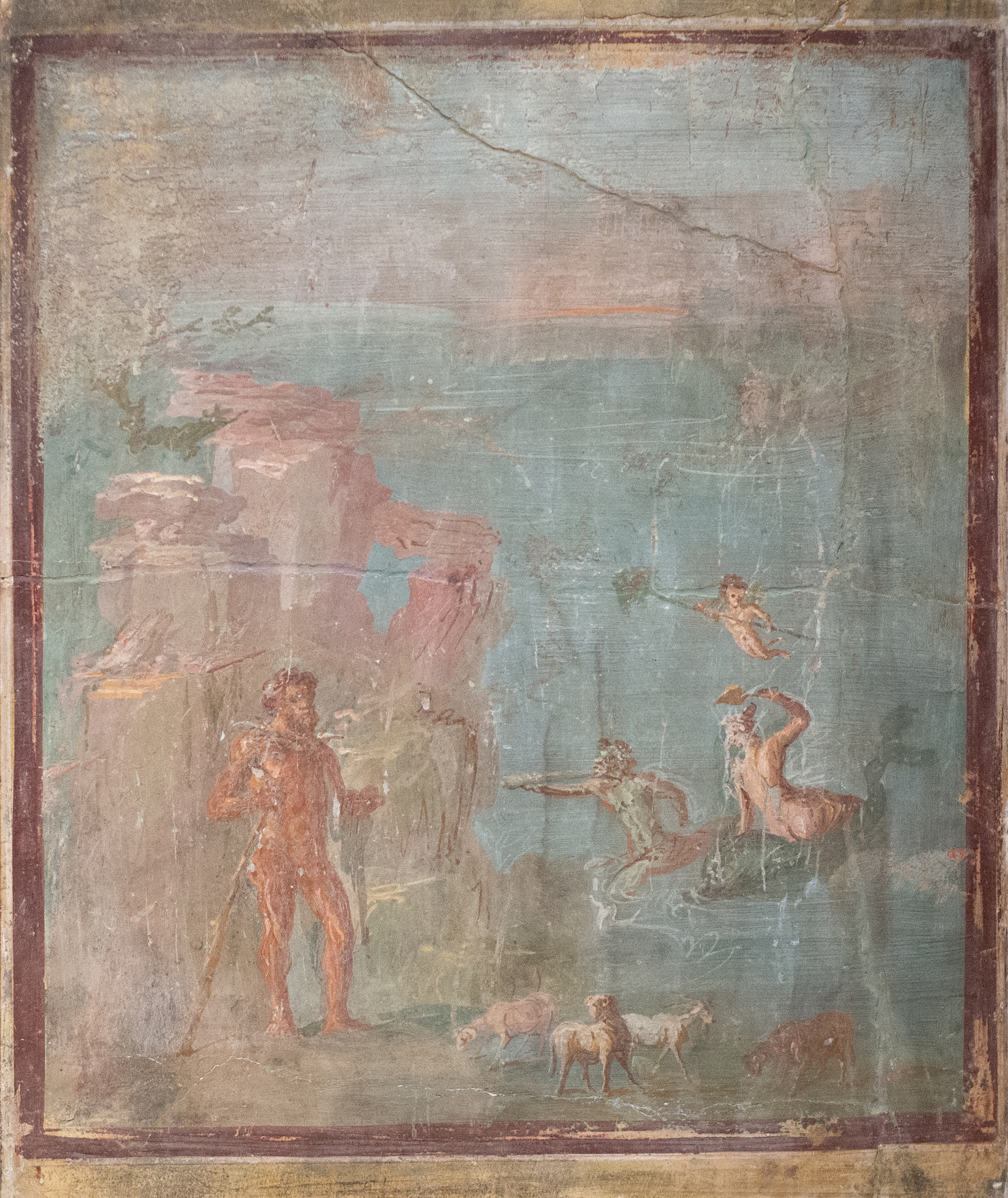
Polyphemus and Galatea

=== Egyptian Collection ===
With 2,500 objects, the museum has one of the largest collection of Egyptian artifacts in Italy, smaller only than those in Turin, Florence and Bologna. It is made up primarily of works from two private collections, assembled by Cardinal Stefano Borgia in the second half of the 18th century, and Picchianti in the first years of the 19th. Since the recent rearrangement of the galleries, these two cores of the collection have been exhibited separately, while other items are on display in the connecting room, including Egyptian and "pseudo-Egyptian" artefacts from Pompeii and other Campanian sites. The collection provides an important record of Egyptian civilization from the Old Kingdom (2700-2200 B.C.) up to the Ptolemaic-Roman era.

=== Secret Cabinet ===
The Secret Cabinet (Gabinetto Segreto) (Gabbinete) or Secret Room is the name the Bourbon Monarchy gave the private rooms in which they held their fairly extensive collection of erotic or sexual items, mostly deriving from excavations of Pompeii and Herculaneum. Access was limited to only persons of mature age and known morals. The rooms were also called Cabinets of matters reserved or obscene or pornographic. After the revolution of 1848, the government of the monarchy even proposed the destruction of objects, fearful of the implications of their ownership, which would tarnish the monarchy with lasciviousness. The then director of the Royal Bourbon Museum instead had access to the collection terminated, and the entrance door was provided with three different locks, whose keys were held respectively by the Director of the Museum, the Museum Controller, and the Palace Butler. The highlight of the censorship occurred in 1851 when even nude Venus statues were locked up, and the entrance walled up in the hope that the collection would vanish from memory.

In September 1860, when the forces of Garibaldi occupied Naples, he ordered that the collection be made available for the general public to view. Since the Royal Butler was no longer available, they broke into the collection. Limiting viewership and censorship have always been part of the history of the collection. Censorship was restored during the era of the Kingdom of Italy, and peaked during the Fascist period, when visitors to the rooms needed the permission of the Minister of National Education in Rome. Censorship persisted in the postwar period up to 1967, abating only after 1971 when the Ministry was given the new rules to regulate requests for visits and access to the section. Completely rebuilt a few years ago with all of the new criteria, the collection was finally opened to the public in April 2000. Visitors under the age of 14 can tour the exhibit only with an adult.

- The Placentarius, the small bronze statue represents a distinctly ithyphallic old nude man who, on the palm of his hand, holds a little silver tray.

== Gallery ==
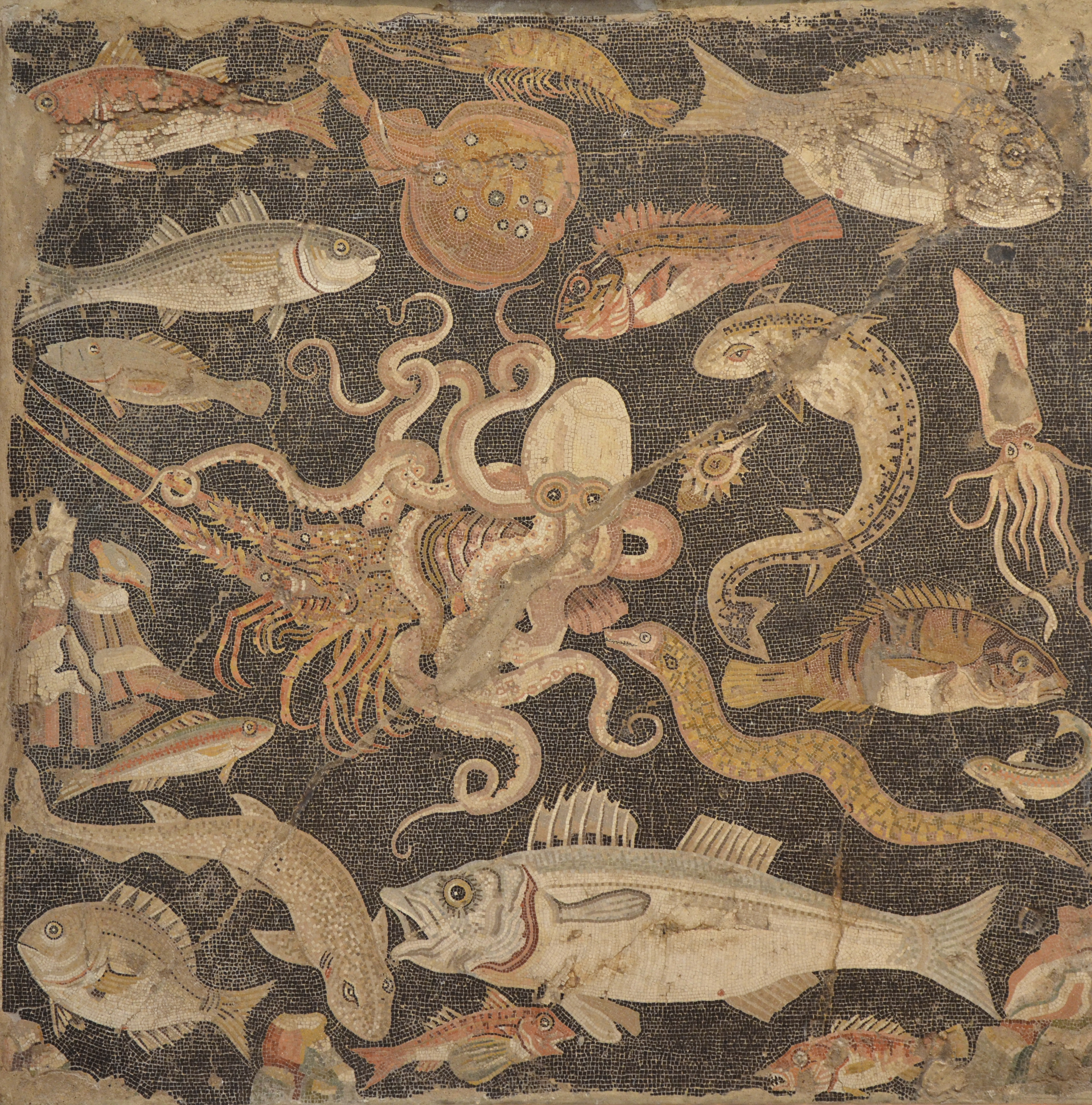
Fish Catalogue mosaic

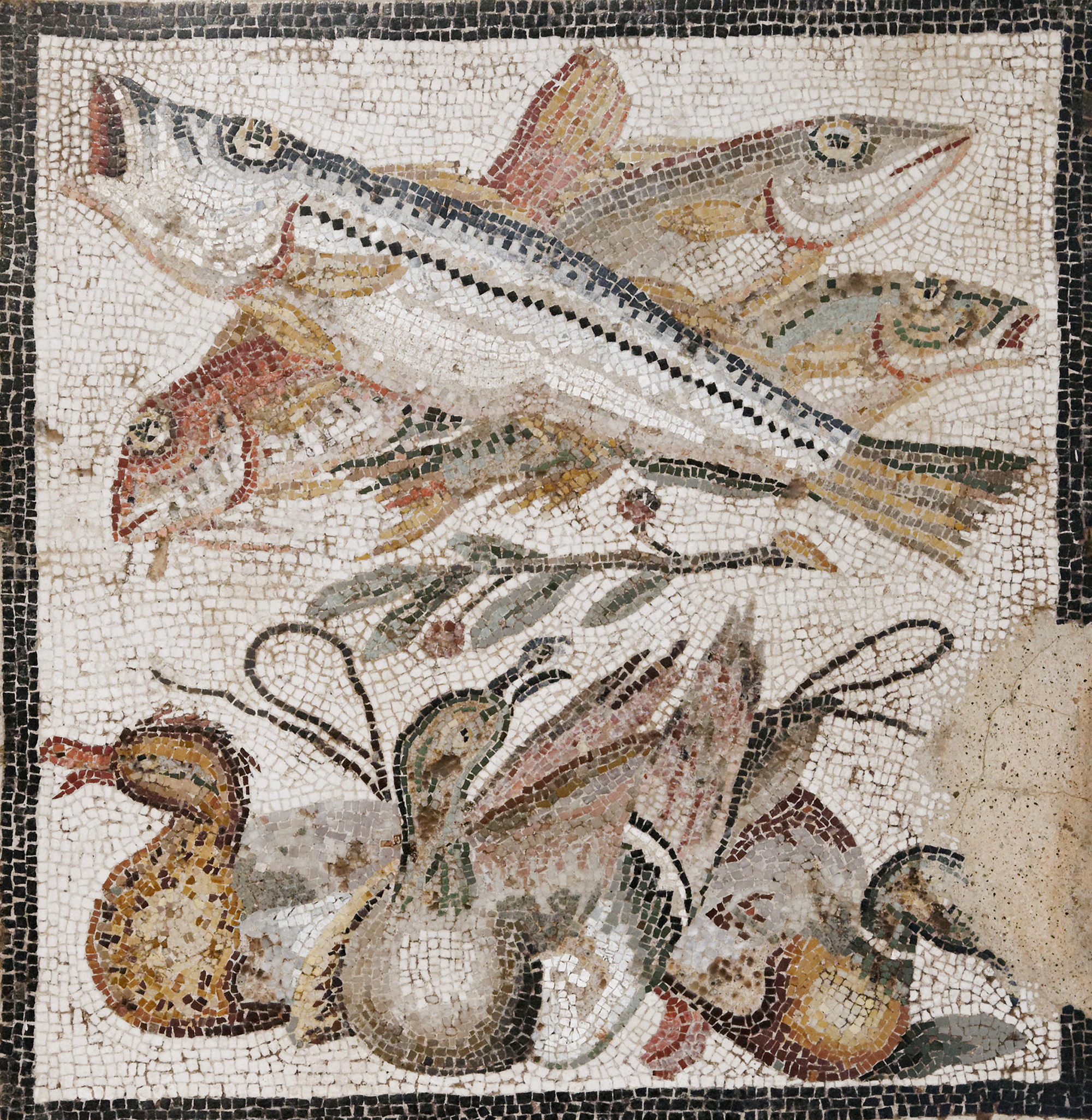
Fish and ducks, Roman mosaic

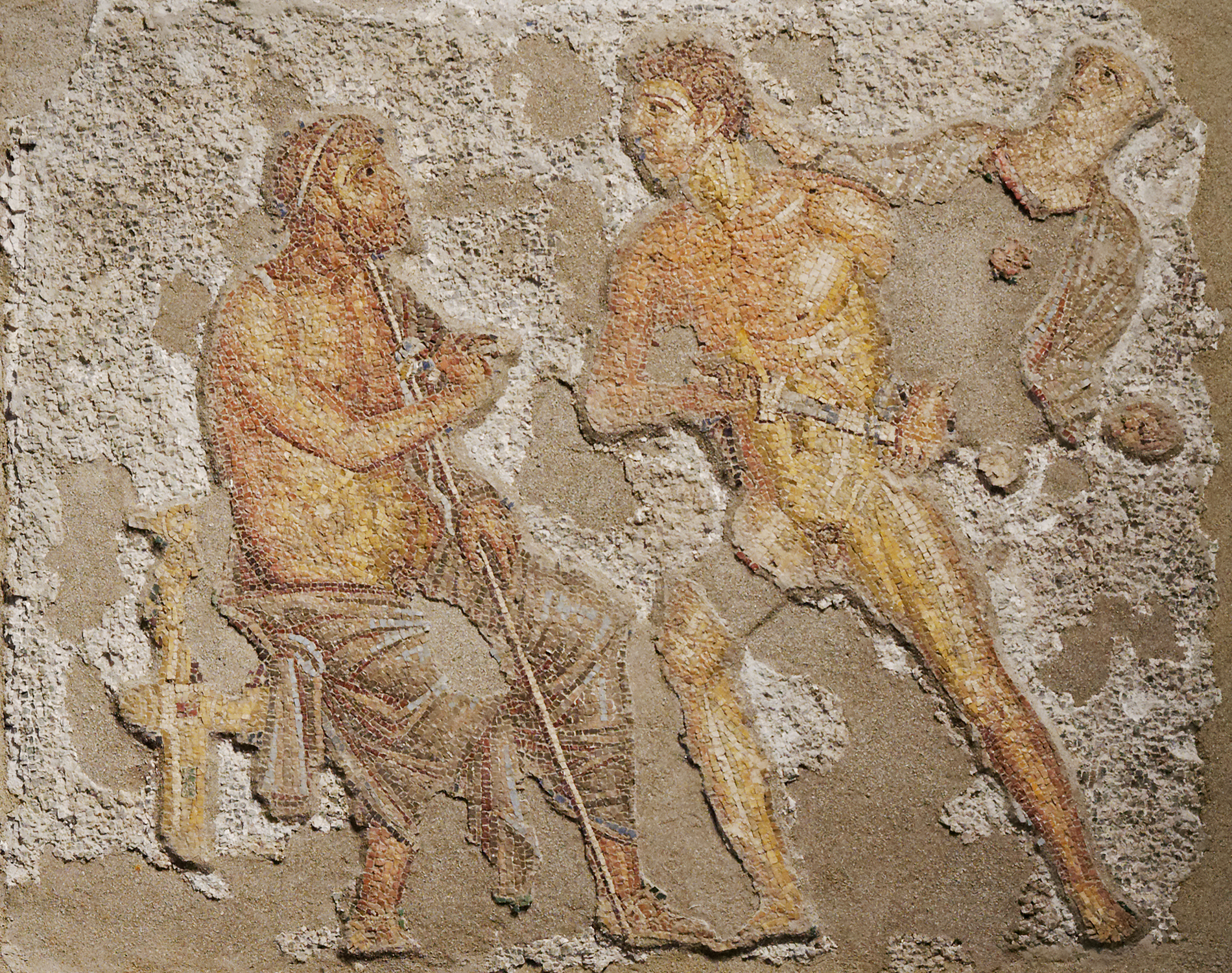
Achilles and Agamemnon, scene from Book I of the Iliad, Roman mosaic

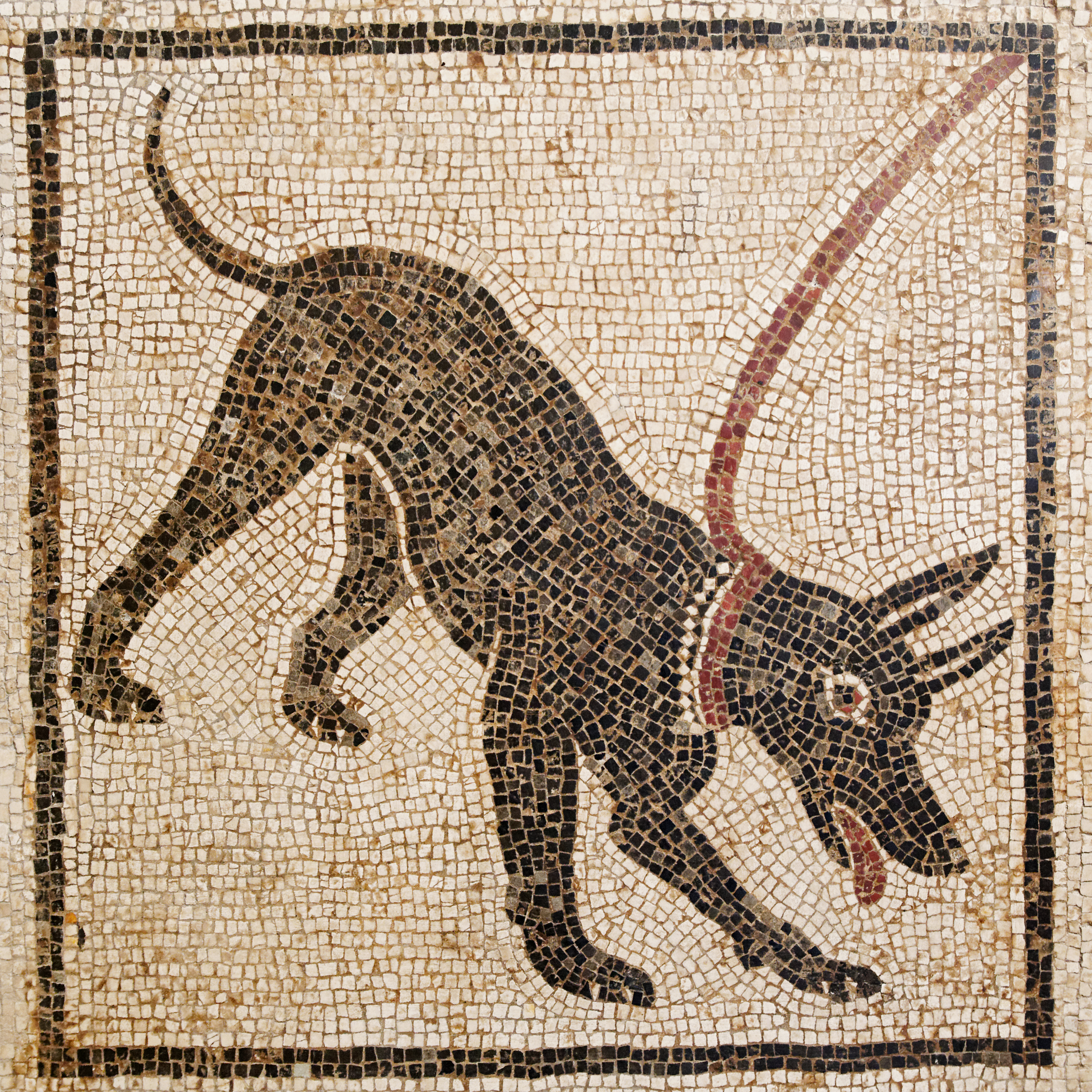
'Cave canem' (beware of the dog) mosaic

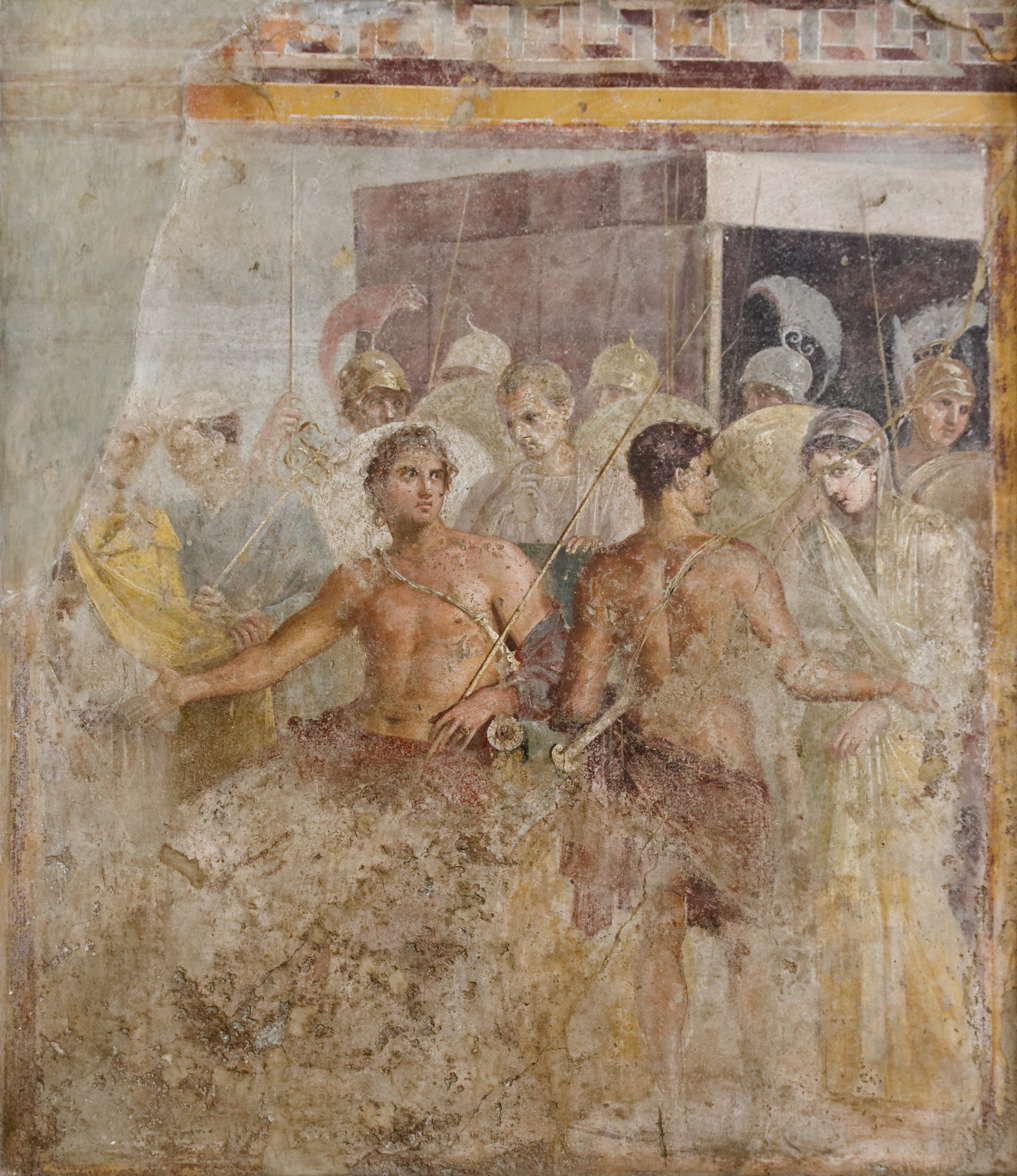
Achilles' surrender of Briseis to Agamemnon, from the House of the Tragic Poet in Pompeii, fresco, 1st century AD

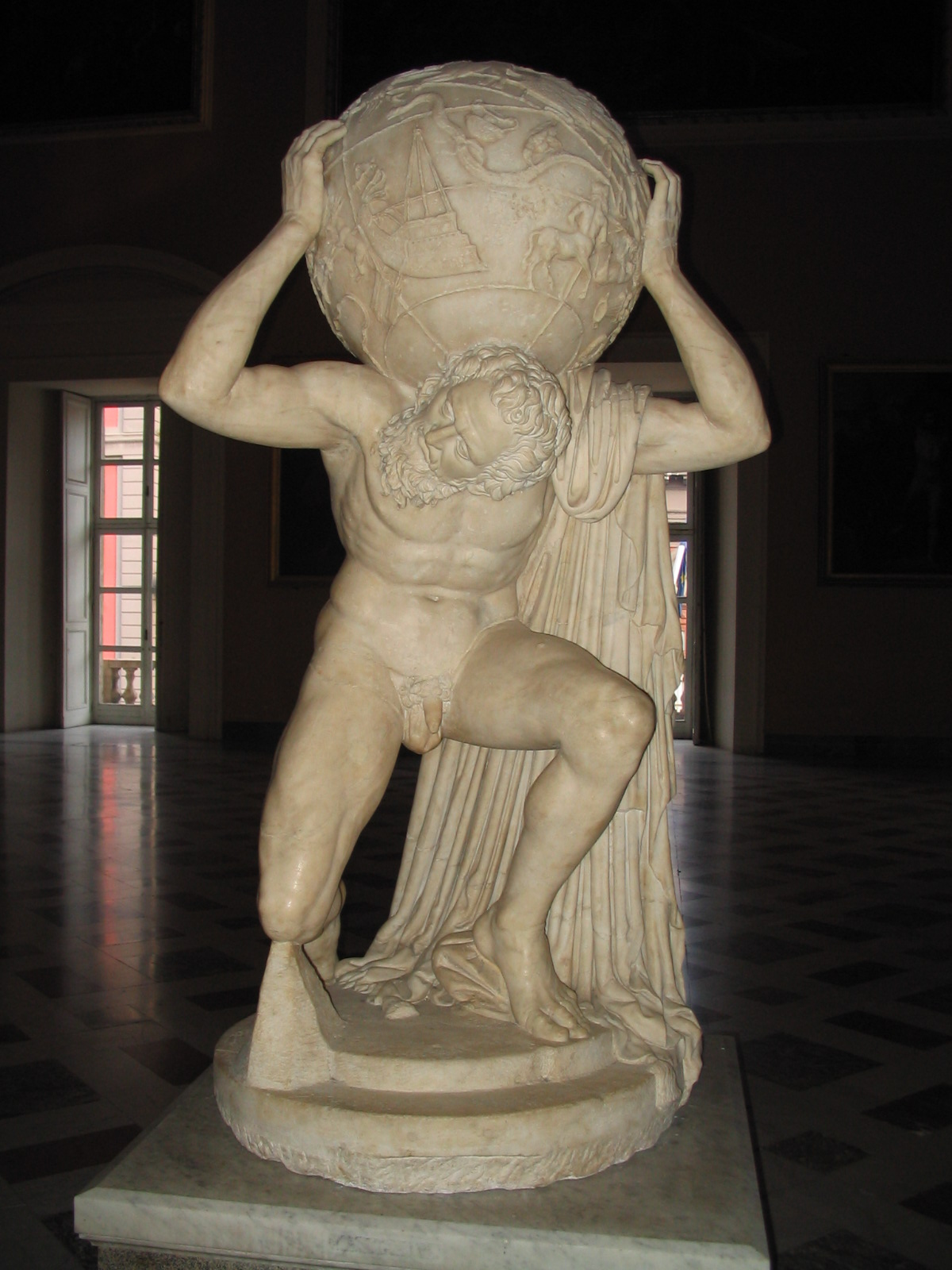
Farnese Atlas

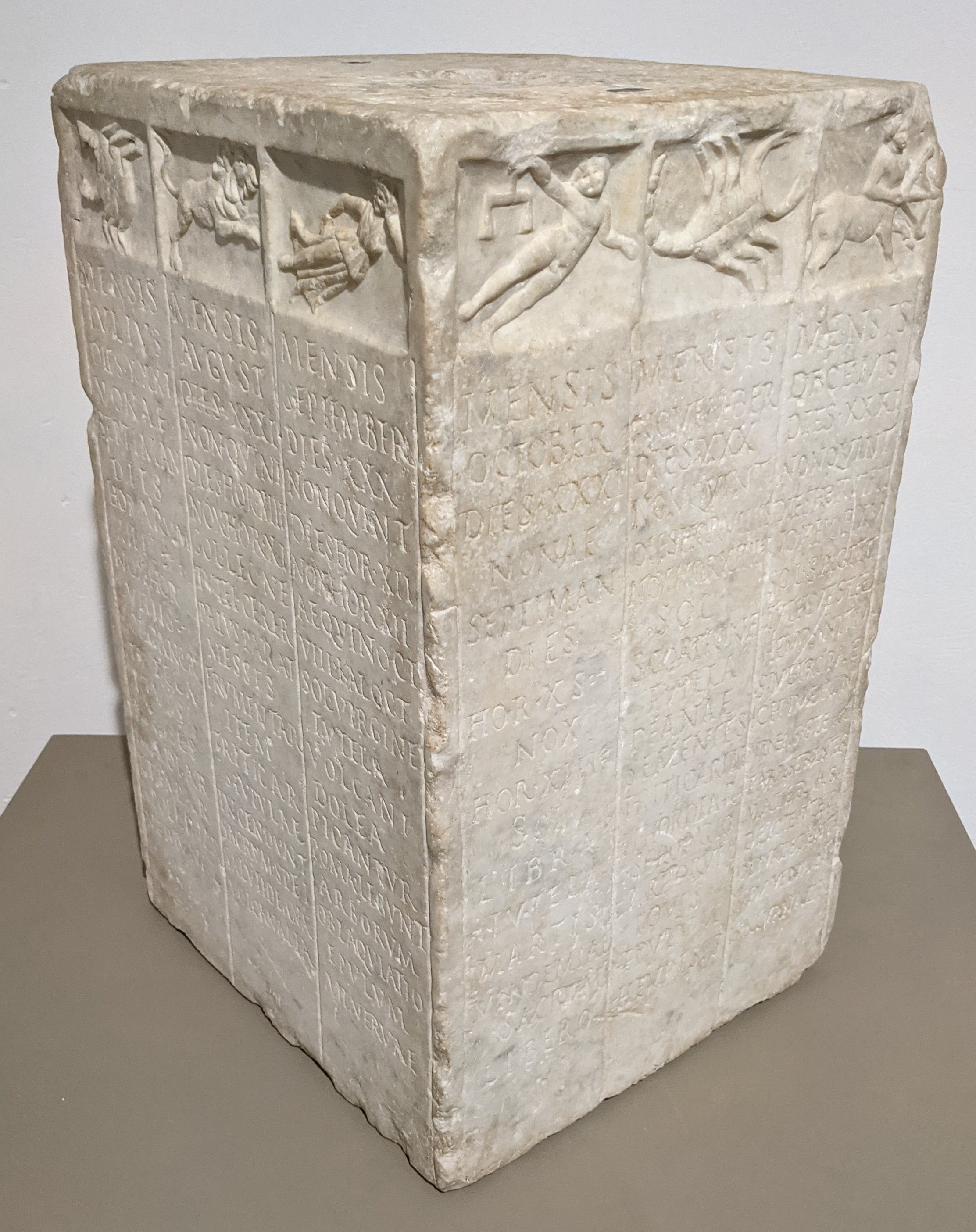
The Menologium Rusticum Colotianum, an ancient Roman almanac

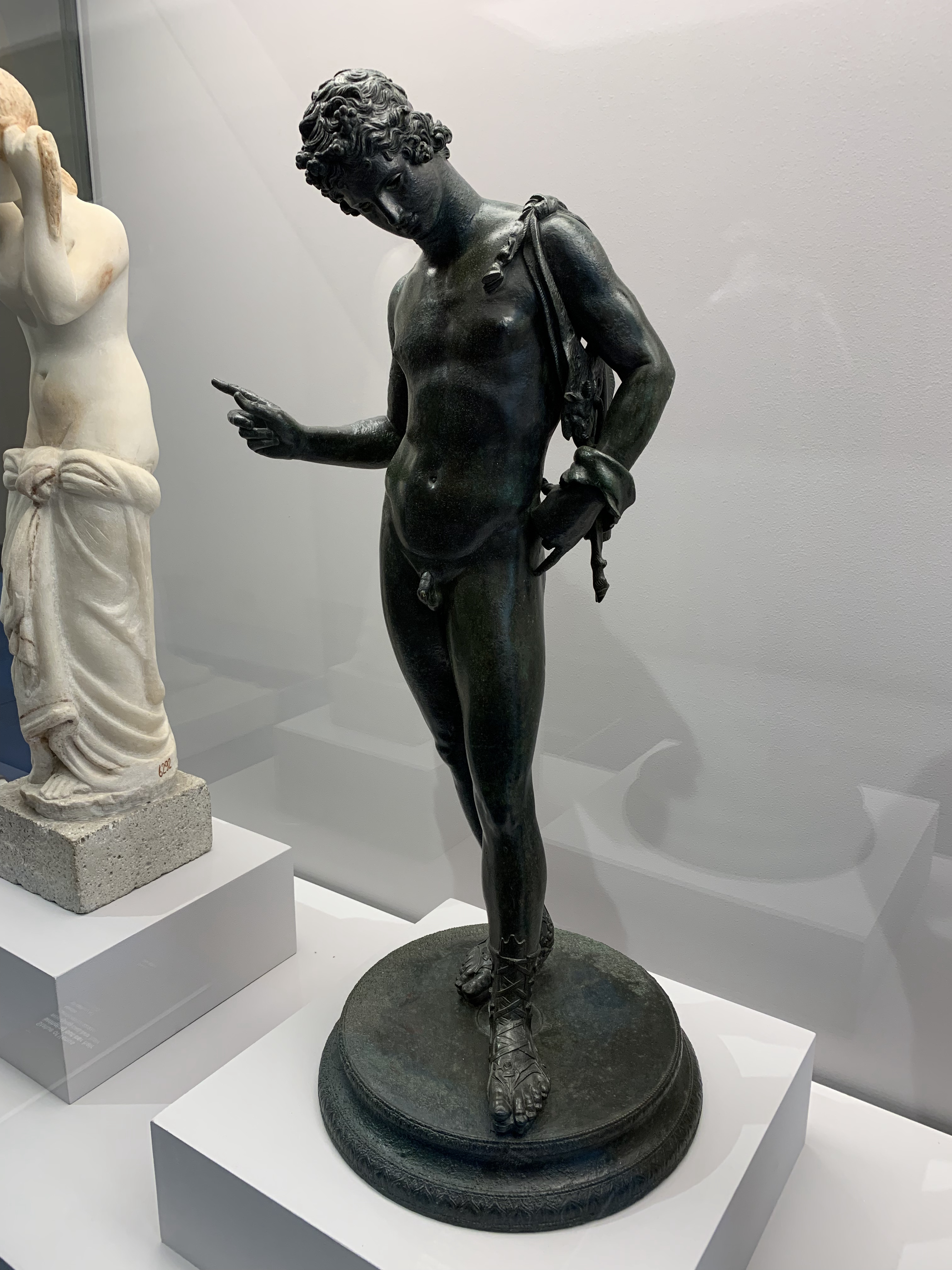
Dionysus, called Narcissus

== See also ==
- List of largest art museums
