= Harmodius and Aristogeiton =

Two men known for their assassination of Hipparchus

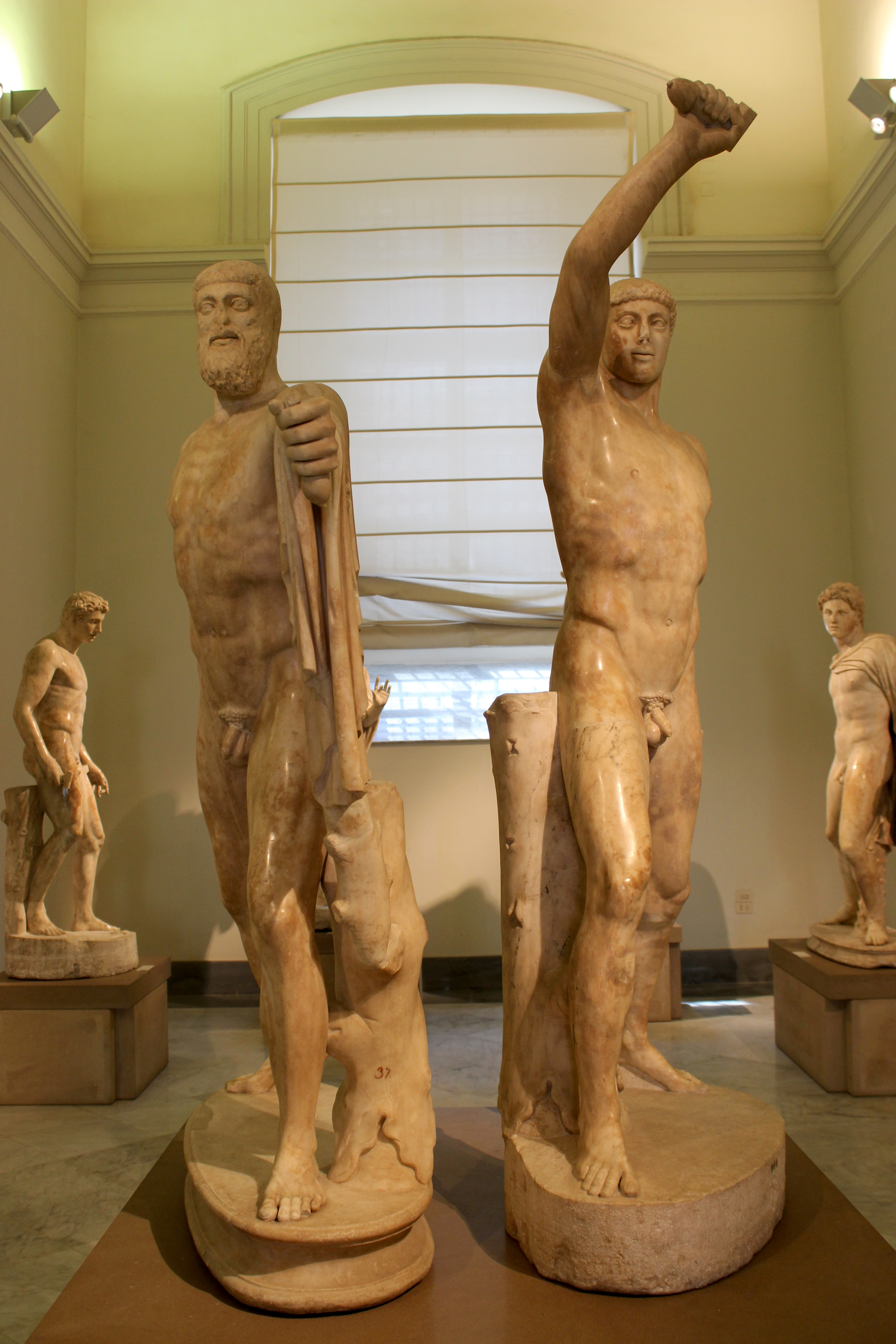
Statue of Harmodius and Aristogeiton, Naples. Roman copy of the Athenian version by Kritios and Nesiotes (see below)

Harmodius (Greek: Ἁρμόδιος, Harmódios) and Aristogeiton (Ἀριστογείτων, Aristogeíton; both died 514 BC) were two lovers in Classical Athens who became known as the Tyrannicides (τυραννόκτονοι, tyrannoktonoi) for their assassination of Hipparchus, the brother of the tyrant Hippias, for which they were executed. A few years later, in 510 BC, the Spartan king Cleomenes I forced Hippias to go into exile, thereby opening the way to the subsequent democratic reforms of Cleisthenes. The Athenian democrats later celebrated Harmodius and Aristogeiton as national heroes, partially to conceal the role played by Sparta in the removal of the Athenian tyranny. Cleisthenes notably commissioned the famous statues of the Tyrannicides.

== Background ==
The two principal historical sources covering Harmodius and Aristogeiton are the History of the Peloponnesian War (VI, 56–59) by Thucydides, and The Constitution of the Athenians (XVIII) attributed to Aristotle or his school. However, their story is documented by a great many other ancient writers, including important sources such as Herodotus and Plutarch. Herodotus claimed that Harmodius and Aristogeiton presumably were "Gephyraeans" (el) i.e. Boeotians of Syrian or Phoenician origin. Plutarch, in his book On the malice of Herodotus, criticized Herodotus for prejudice and misrepresentation and he argued that Harmodius and Aristogeiton were Euboeans or Eretrians.

Peisistratus had become tyrant of Athens after his third attempt in 546/7 BC. In Archaic Greece, the term tyrant had a neutral meaning, and denoted a ruler that seized power and ruled outside of a state's constitutional law. When Peisistratus died in 528/7 BC, his son Hippias took the position of Archon and became the new tyrant of Athens, with the help of his brother, Hipparchus, who acted as the minister of culture. The two continued their father's policies, but their popularity declined after Hipparchus began to abuse the power of his position.

Thucydides offers this explanation for Harmodios and Aristogeiton's actions in Book VI: Hipparchus approached Harmodius with amorous intentions. Harmodius was the eromenos (younger lover) of Aristogeiton. Harmodius rejected Hipparchus and told Aristogeiton what had happened. Hipparchus, spurned, invited Harmodius' young sister to be the kanephoros (to carry the ceremonial offering basket) at the Panathenaea festival, then publicly chased her away on the pretext she was not a virgin, as required, causing shame on Harmodius' family. With his lover Aristogeiton, Harmodius resolved to assassinate both Hippias and Hipparchus and thus to overthrow the tyranny. Harmodios and Aristogeiton successfully killed Hipparchus during the 514 BC Panathenaia, but Hippias survived and remained in power. In the four years between Hipparchus' assassination and the deposition of the Peisistratids, Hippias became an increasingly oppressive tyrant.

According to Aristotle, it was Thessalos, the hot-headed son of Peisistratus' Argive concubine, and thus half-brother to Hipparchus, who was the one to court Harmodius and drive off his sister.

== The assassination ==
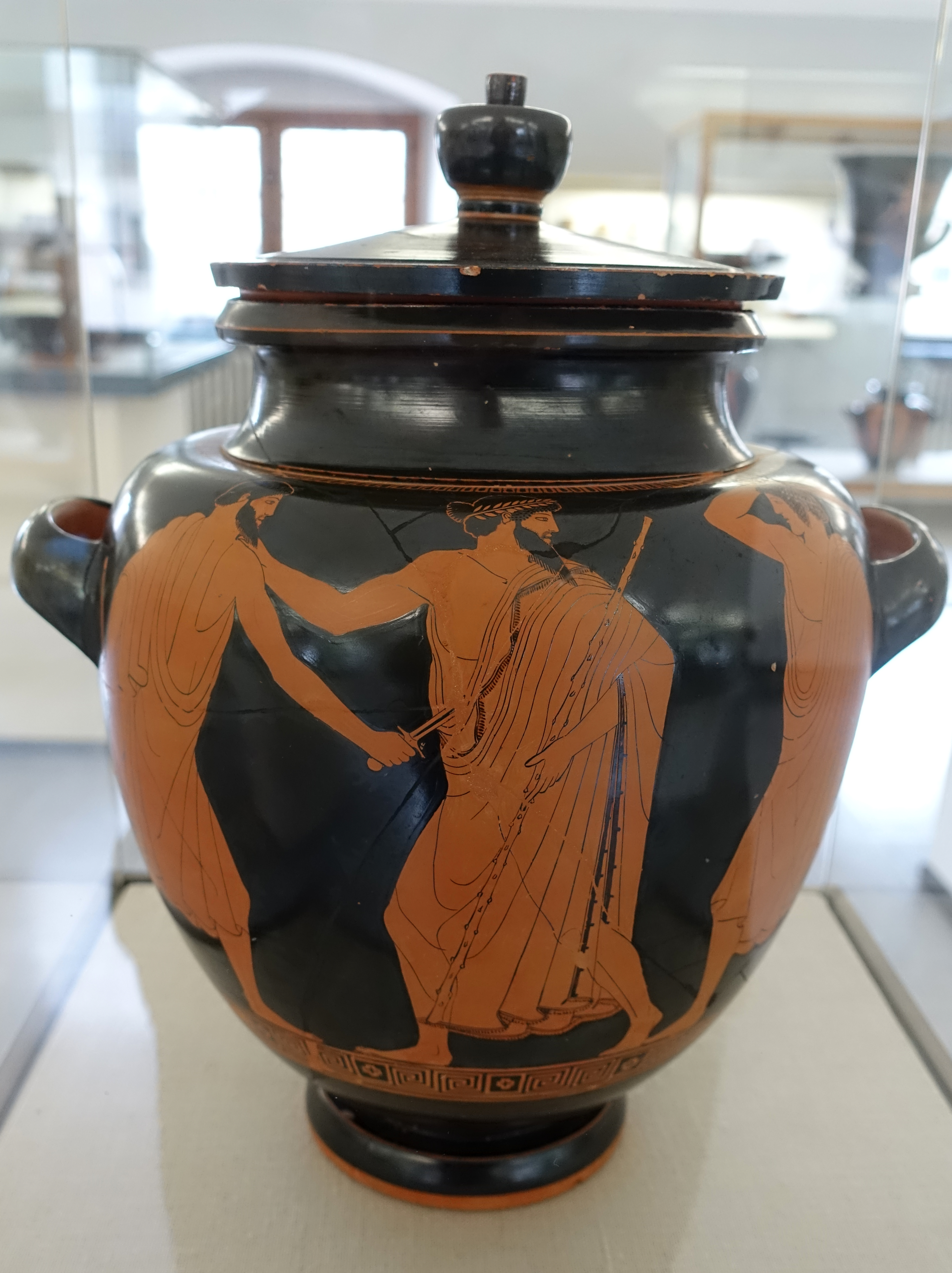
Death of the tyrant Hipparchus, by the Syriskos Painter, 475–470 BC

The plot – to be carried out by means of daggers hidden in the ceremonial myrtle wreaths on the occasion of the Panathenaic Games – involved a number of other co-conspirators. Thucydides claims that this day was chosen because during the Panathenaic festival, it was customary for the citizens taking part in the procession to go armed, while carrying weapons on any other day would have been suspicious. Aristotle disagrees, asserting that the custom of bearing weapons was introduced later, by the democracy.

Seeing one of the co-conspirators greet Hippias in a friendly manner on the assigned day, the two thought themselves betrayed and rushed into action, ruining the carefully laid plans. They managed to kill Hipparchus, stabbing him to death as he was organizing the Panathenaean processions at the foot of the Acropolis. Herodotus expresses surprise at this event, asserting that Hipparchus had received a clear warning concerning his fate in a dream. Harmodius was killed on the spot by spearmen of Hipparchus' guards, while Aristogeiton was arrested shortly thereafter. Upon being told of the event, Hippias ordered the marching Greeks to lay down their ceremonial weapons and to gather at an indicated spot. All those with concealed weapons or under suspicion were arrested, gaining Hippias a respite from the uprising.

Thucydides' identification of Hippias as the two's purported main target, rather than Hipparchus who was Aristogeiton's rival erastes, has been suggested as a possible indication of bias on his part.

=== Aristogeiton's torture ===
Aristotle in the Constitution of Athens preserves a tradition that Aristogeiton died only after being tortured in the hope that he would reveal the names of the other conspirators. During his ordeal, personally overseen by Hippias, he feigned willingness to betray his co-conspirators, claiming only Hippias' handshake as guarantee of safety. Upon receiving the tyrant's hand he is reputed to have berated him for shaking the hand of his own brother's murderer, upon which the tyrant wheeled and struck him down on the spot.

=== Leæna ===
Likewise, there is a later tradition that Aristogeiton (or Harmodius)^{B} was in love with a courtesan (see hetaera) by the name of Leæna (Λέαινα – meaning lioness) who also was kept by Hippias under torture – in a vain attempt to force her to divulge the names of the other conspirators – until she died. One version of her story holds that previous to being tortured she had bitten off her tongue, afraid that her resolve would break from the pain of the torture. Another is that the Athenians, unwilling to honour a courtesan, placed a statue of a lioness without a tongue in the vestibule of the Acropolis simply to honor her fortitude in maintaining silence. The statue was made by the sculptor Amphicrates. Pausanias alleges that it was in her honor that Athenian statues of Aphrodite began from then on to be accompanied by stone lionesses. Leæna's story, however, is only told in later antiquity sources and is likely spurious.

=== Aftermath ===
His brother's murder led Hippias to establish an even stricter tyranny, which proved very unpopular and was overthrown, after an intervention of an army from Sparta led by the king Cleomenes I, in 510. This was followed by the reforms of Cleisthenes, who established a democracy in Athens.

== Apotheosis ==
Subsequent history came to identify the figures of Harmodius and Aristogeiton as martyrs to the cause of Athenian freedom, possibly for political and class reasons, and they became known as "the Liberators" (eleutherioi) and "the Tyrannicides" (tyrannophonoi). According to later writers, descendants of Harmodius and Aristogeiton's families were given hereditary privileges, such as sitesis (the right to take meals at public expense in the town hall), ateleia (exemption from certain religious duties), and proedria (front-row seats in the theater). A number of years after the event, it had become a received tradition among the Athenians to believe that Hipparchus was the elder of the brothers, and to fashion him as the tyrant. The story of the tyrannicides was heavily promoted by the Athenians in order to erase the embarrassment of owing the removal of their tyranny to Sparta.

=== Statues and artistic depictions ===
After the establishment of democracy, Cleisthenes commissioned the sculptor Antenor to produce a bronze^{A} statue group of Harmodius and Aristogeiton. It was the first commission of its kind, and the very first statue to be paid for out of public funds, as the two were the first Greeks considered by their countrymen worthy of having statues raised to them. According to Pliny the Elder, it was erected in the Kerameikos in 509, as part of a cenotaph of the heroes. However, a far more probable location is in the Agora at Athens, and many later authors such as Pausanias and Timaeus attest to this. Annual offerings (enagismata) were presented there by the polemarch, the Athenian minister of war. There it stood alone as special laws prohibited the erection of any other statues in their vicinity. Upon its base was inscribed a verse by the poet Simonides:

A marvelous great light shone upon Athens when Aristogeiton and Harmodios slew Hipparchus.

The statue was taken as war booty in 480 BC by Xerxes I during the early Greco-Persian Wars and installed by him at Susa. As soon as the Greeks vanquished the Persians at Salamis, a new statue was commissioned. It was sculpted this time by Kritios and Nesiotes, and set up in 477/476 BC. It is the one which served as template for the group we possess today, which was found in the ruins of Hadrian's villa and is now in Naples. According to Arrian, when Alexander the Great conquered the Persian empire, in 330, he discovered the statue at Susa and had it shipped back to Athens. When the statue, on its journey back, arrived at Rhodes it was given divine honors.

Several comments of the ancients regarding the statue have come down to us. When asked, in the presence of Dionysius, the tyrant of Syracuse, which type of bronze was the best, Antiphon the Sophist replied,

That of which the Athenians made the statues of Harmodius and Aristogeiton."

Lycurgus, in his oration against Leocrates, asserts that

In the rest of Greece you will find statues erected in the public places to the conquerors in the games, but amongst you they are dedicated only to good generals, and to those who have destroyed tyrants.

Other sculptors made statues of the heroes, such as Praxiteles, who made two, also of bronze.

The statue group has been seen, in modern times, as an invitation to identify erotically and politically with the figures, and to become oneself a tyrannicide. According to Andrew Stewart, the statue

not only placed the homoerotic bond at the core of Athenian political freedom, but asserted that it and the manly virtues (aretai) of courage, boldness and self-sacrifice that it generated were the only guarantors of that freedom’s continued existence.

The configuration of the group is duplicated on a painted vase, a Panathenaic amphora from 400, and on a bas-relief on the Elgin throne, dated to ca. 300.

=== Skolia ===
Another tribute to the two heroes was a hymn (skolion) praising them for restoring isonomia (equal distribution of justice) to the Athenians. The skolion may be referred to 500 BC or thereabouts, and is ascribed to Callistratus, an Athenian poet known only for this work. It is preserved by Athenaeus. Its popularity was such that

at every banquet, nay, in the streets and in the meanest assembly of the common people, that convivial ode was daily sung,

When sung, the singer would hold a branch of myrtle in his hand. This ode has been translated by many modern poets such as Edgar Allan Poe, who composed his Hymn to Aristogeiton and Harmodius in 1827. The following translation was judged to be the best and most faithful of a number of versions attempted in Victorian England.

In myrtles veil'd will I the falchion wear,
For thus the patriot sword
Harmodius and Aristogiton bare,
When they the tyrant's bosom gored,
And bade the men of Athens be
Regenerate in equality.

Oh! beloved Harmodius! never
Shall death be thine, who liv'st for ever.
Thy shade, as men have told, inherits
The islands of the blessed spirits,
Where deathless live the glorious dead,
Achilles fleet of foot, and Diomed.

In myrtles veil'd will I the falchion wear,
For thus the patriot sword
Harmodius and Aristogiton bare,
When they the tyrant's bosom gored;
When in Minerva's festal rite
They closed Hipparchus' eyes in night.

Harmodius' praise, Aristogiton's name,
Shall bloom on earth with undecaying fame;
Who with the myrtle-wreathed sword
The tyrant's bosom gored,
And bade the men of Athens be
Regenerate in equality.

== Importance to the erastes-eromenos tradition ==
The story of Harmodius and Aristogeiton, and its treatment by later Greek writers, is illustrative of attitudes to pederasty in ancient Greece. Both Thucydides and Herodotus describe the two as lovers, their love affair was styled as moderate (sophron) and legitimate (dikaios). Further confirming the status of the two as paragons of pederastic ethics, a domain forbidden to slaves, a law was passed prohibiting slaves from being named after the two heroes.

The story continued to be cited as an admirable example of heroism and devotion for many years. In 346 BC, for example, the politician Timarchus was prosecuted (for political reasons) on the grounds that he had prostituted himself as a youth. The orator who defended him, Demosthenes, cited Harmodius and Aristogeiton, as examples of the beneficial effects of same-sex relationships. Aeschines offers them as an example of dikaios erōs, "just love", and as proof of the boons such love brings to lovers – who were both improved by love beyond all praise – as well as to the city.

== See also ==
- Athenian democracy
- Harmodius and Aristogeiton (sculpture)

== Notes ==
- ^{A} Lucian refers to this "χαλκοῦς" (of copper) statue in Περὶ Παρασίτου,
- ^{B}
  Cecropia effictam quam cernis in arce Leaenam,
  Harmodii (an nescis hospes?) amica fuit.
  Sic animum placuit monstrare viraginis acrem
  More ferae, nomen vel quia tale tulit.
  Quòd fidibus contorta, suo non prodidit ullum
  Indicio, elinguem reddidit Iphicrates.

== Bibliography ==
Ancient sources

- Aeschines (2001) [346 BCE]. Against Timarchos. Clarendon Ancient History Series. Translated by Fisher, Nick. Oxford University Press.
- Aeschines (1919). The speeches of Aeschines. Works.English & Greek. Translated by Adams, Charles Darwin. Harvard University Press.
- Alciato, Andrea (1531). Emblemata. p. Emblema XIII.
- Aristotle (1952). Athenian Constitution. Translated by Rackham, H. Cambridge, MA & London: Harvard University Press & William Heinemann Ltd.
- Athenaeus. The Deipnosophists. Vol. XIII, VI. 70.
- Demosthenes (1886). King, John R. (ed.). Against Leptines. Macmillan.
- Gellius, Aulus (1927). The Attic Nights. Translated by Rolfe, John C. Harvard University Press.
- Herodotus (1920). Histories. Translated by Godley, A. D. Cambridge, MA: Harvard University Press.
- Libanius (1913). Foerster, Richard (ed.). Avari Thesauro Privati Lamentatio (Declamation 51). in aedibus B. G. Teubneri.
- Lycurgus. Against Leocrates.
- Pausanias (1918). Description of Greece. Translated by Jones, W.H.S.; Ormerod, H.A. Harvard University Press. p. 1.8.5.
- Pliny the Elder. Natural History. Vol. XXXIV.
- Plutarch (2009) [1775]. Krigel, C.A. (ed.). Libellus De Discrimine Amici Et Adulatoris Graece Primum Seorsim Edidit Varietatem Lectionis (in Latin). Kessinger Publishing. ISBN 9781104950620.
- Plutarch (1878). "The Malice of Herodotus". Moralia (Complete). Translated by Goodwin, William W.
- Polyaenus. Strategies. Vol. VIII. xlv.
- Factorum et dictorum memorabilium libri IX. English. Translated by Speed, Samuel. J.C. 1678. p. 227.
- Thucydides. History of the Peloponnesian War. Vol. VI. 56–59.

Modern sources

- Chisholm, Hugh, ed. (1911). "Harmodius" . Encyclopædia Britannica. Vol. 12 (11th ed.). Cambridge University Press. p. 955.
- Chisholm, Hugh, ed. (1911). "Callistratus" . Encyclopædia Britannica. Vol. 5 (11th ed.). Cambridge University Press. p. 58.
- Carpenter, Thomas H.; Mendoça, Melanie; Beazley, John Davidson; Mannack, Thomas, eds. (1989). Beazley addenda additional references to ABV, ARV² & Paralipomena (2nd ed.). Oxford University Press.
- Demosthenes; Kennedy, Charles Rann (1856). The Orations of Demosthenes. H.S. Bohn. p. 264.
- Edmonds, John Maxwell (1931). Lyra Graeca; Being the Remains of All the Greek Lyric Poets from Eumelus to Timotheus excepting Pindar, (3 vols). Vol. 2. London & New York: William Heinemann & G. P. Putnam's Sons. p. 377.
- Elton (1833). "The Greek Anthology". Blackwood's Magazine. 33 (209). William Blackwood: 885.
- Endres, Nikolai (2003). "Subjects of the Visual Arts: Harmodius and Aristogeiton (Sixth Century-514 B. C. E.)". GLBTQ. Archived from the original on 2014-10-06.
- Fabbro, Helena (1995). Carmina Convivalia Attica. Critical Edition with Translation and Commentary. Roma (publisher Istituti Editoriali e Poligrafici Internazionali) pp. 30–34, 76–77, 137–152 ISBN 88-8147-082-9
- "Ceremonial Chair (The Elgin Throne". J. Paul Getty Museum. 74.AA.12. Archived from the original on 2006-09-18.
- Lucian: Works. Translated by Harmon, A.M. Harvard University Press. 1921.
- Kapparis, Konstantinos (2018). Prostitution in the Ancient Greek World. De Gruyter. p. 99. ISBN 978-3110556759.
- Larcher, Pierre-Henri (1844). Larcher's Notes on Herodotus, historical and critical comments on the History of Herodotus, with a chronological table; (Translated from the French). Translated by William Desborough Cooley. p. 453. para 129.
- Lavelle, Brian M. (Autumn 1986). "The Nature of Hipparchos' Insult to Harmodios". The American Journal of Philology. 107 (3): 318–331. doi:10.2307/294689. JSTOR 294689.
- Lavelle, Brian M. (1993). The Sorrow and the Pity: A Prolegomenon to a History of Athens under the Peisistratids, c. 560–510 B.C. Historia Einzelschriften 80. Stuttgart: Franz Steiner Verlag. ISBN 3-515-06318-8.
- Law, Randall David (2009). Terrorism: a history (illustrated ed.). Polity. p. 18. ISBN 978-0-7456-4038-9.
- Lecky, W.E.H., ed. (1898). History of European Morals. Vol. II. pp. 274–295.
- Lowth, Robert (1839) [1756]. "Lecture I. The Introduction. Of the Uses and Design of Poetry". Lectures on the Sacred Poetry of the Hebrews. Translated by Gregory G. (fourth ed.). Oxford University.
- Mattusch, Carol C. (1988). "6. Variations". Greek Bronze Statuary From the Beginnings Through the Fifth Century B.C. Cornell University Press. p. 119. doi:10.7591/9781501746062-008. ISBN 9781501746062. S2CID 243070085.
- Nagy, Gregory (1999) [1979]. "Chapter 10: Poetic Visions of Immortality for the Hero". The Best of the Achaeans Concepts of the Hero in Archaic Greek Poetry (Revised ed.). The Johns Hopkins University Press. Archived from the original on 2016-03-04.
- Arrian; Diodorus; Plutarch; Quintus Curtius (2005-03-11). Romm, James S.; Mensch, Pamela (eds.). Alexander The Great: Selections from Arrian, Diodorus, Plutarch, and Quintus Curtius. Hackett Publishing Company. ISBN 9781603843331.
- de Ste. Croix, G.E.M. (2004). "Herodotus and King Cleomenes I of Sparta". In Harvey, David; Parker, Robert (eds.). Athenian Democratic Origins and other essays. Oxford University Press. pp. 421–440. ISBN 0199285160.
- Smith, William, ed. (1870). "Amphicrates". Dictionary of Greek and Roman Biography and Mythology. Vol. 1. p. 149. Archived from the original on December 19, 2005.
- Smyth, Herbert Weir (1900). Greek Melic Poets. Macmillan & Co. p. 478.
- Spivey, Nigel (1996). Understanding Greek Sculpture. Thames & Hudson. pp. 114–115. ISBN 978-0500237106.
- Stewart, Andrew (1997). Art, Desire, and the Body in Ancient Greece. Cambridge: Cambridge University Press. p. 73. ISBN 978-0521456807.
- "London B 605 (Vase)". Tufts University.
- Wohl, Victoria (2003). Love among the Ruins: The Erotics of Democracy in Classical Athens. Princeton University Press. ISBN 9780691095226.
- Worthington, Ian (2003). Alexander the Great: A Reader. Routledge. p. 45. ISBN 0-415-29187-9.
