= Blond Kouros's Head of the Acropolis =

Ancient sculpture

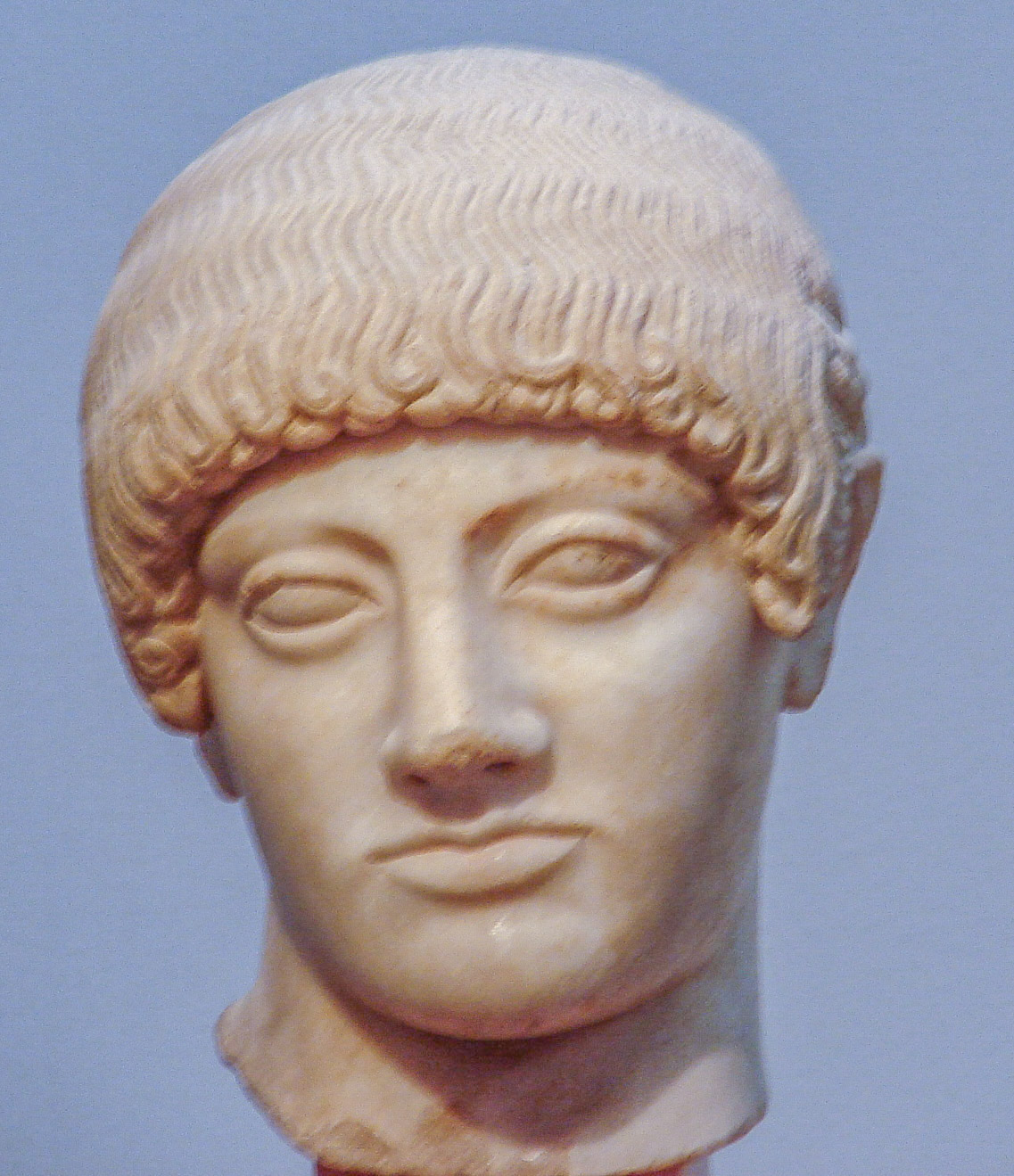
Head of a Blond Kouros (Acropolis Museum, Athens)

The so-called Blond Kouros's Head of the Acropolis is the head of a lost marble statue of a young man (Kouros or Ephebe sculpture type) of ca 480 BC, in the Acropolis Museum in Athens, Greece. The head and part of the pelvis were found in 1923 northeast of the museum site on the Acropolis of Athens. It belongs to the late archaic or early classical period (Severe style). The curly hair points more to the Archaic than the Classical period.

It measures 25 cm in the vertical, in the horizontal under the ears 12.5 cm and in the depth 22.8 cm. (Schrader 1939:197).

This sculpture could have been created by one of the teachers of Phidias, Hegias of Athens or Ageladas of Argos.

The original blond painting of the curly hair is faded. Only remnants of the paint are visible today.

== Gallery ==
Copy of blond Kouros' head, color rendition believed to have been used by the artist, painted by Dr. Alfons Neubauer of the Glyptothek, Munich

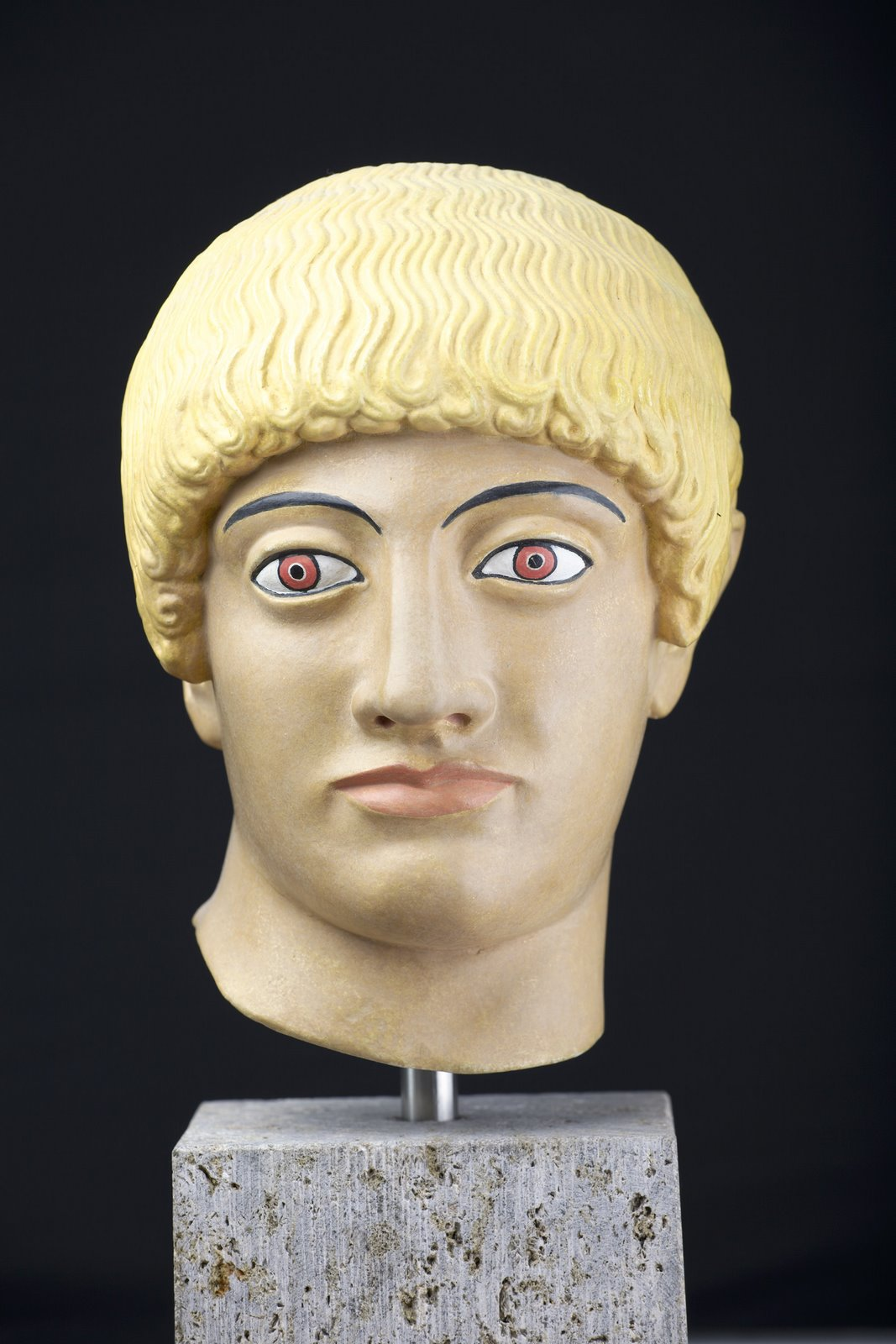

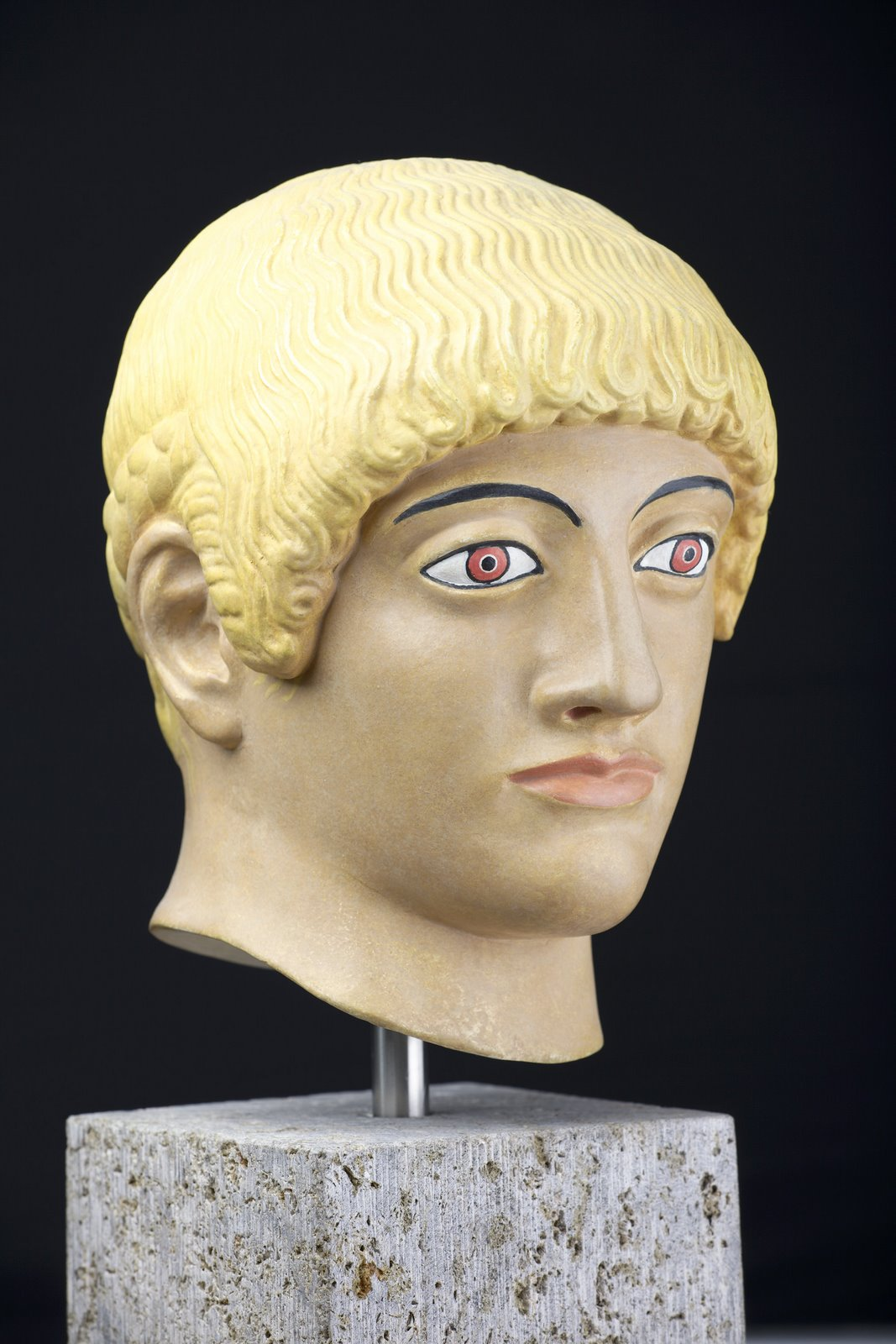

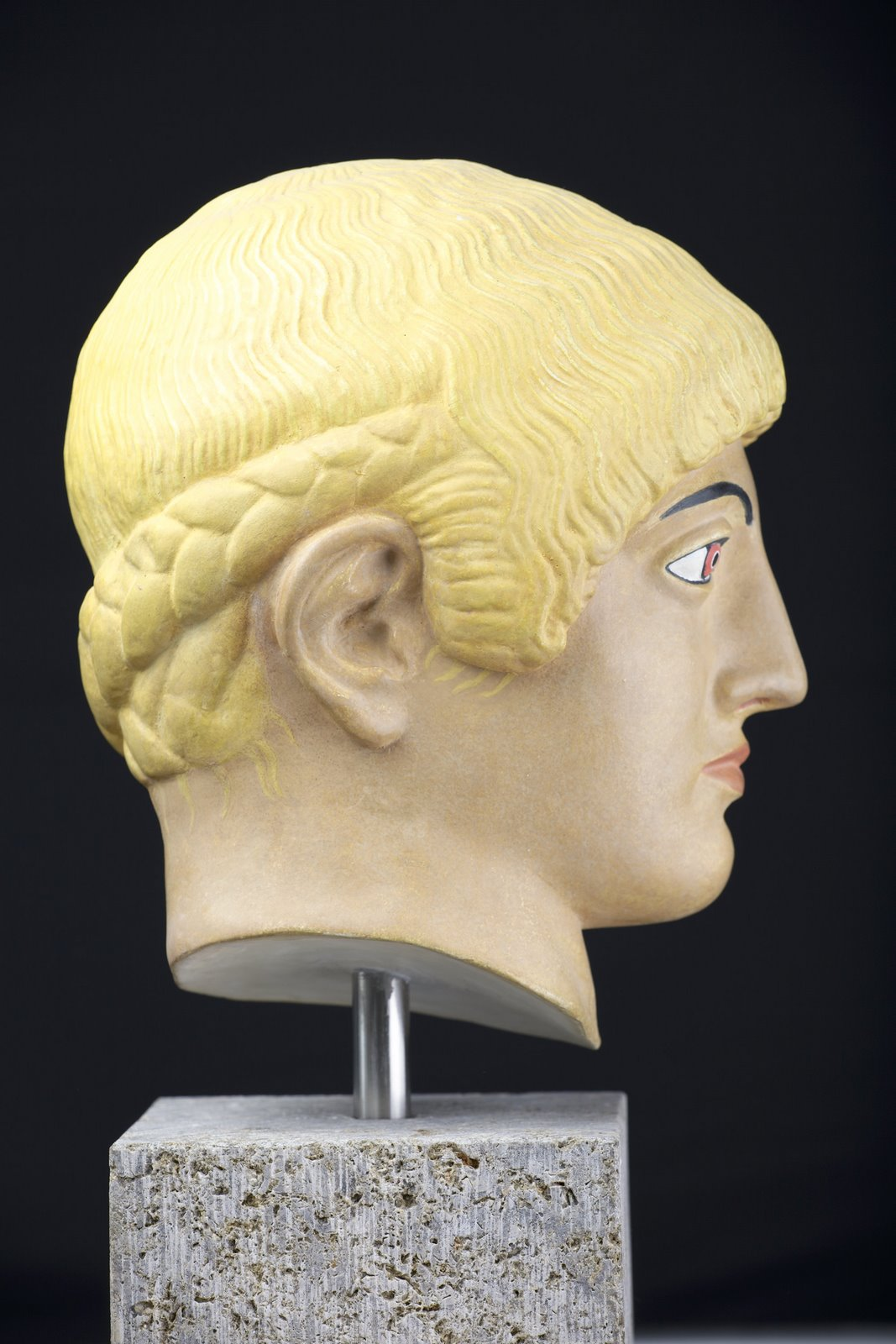

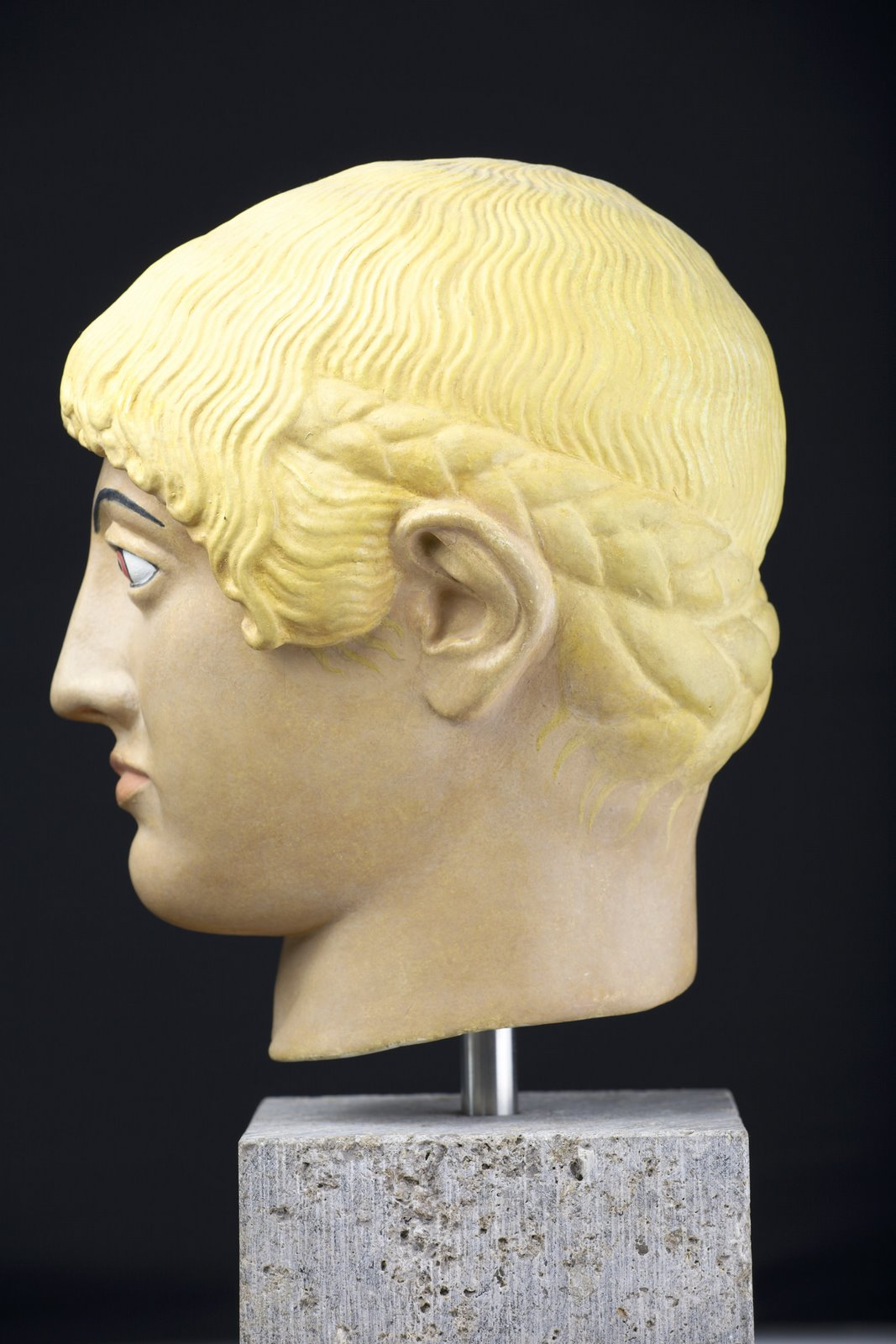

== Bibliography ==
- Hans Schrader: Die Archaischen Marmorbildwerke der Akropolis (Textband). Klostermann, Frankfurt am Main 1939, pp 197ff. Nr. 302.
- Vinzenz Brinkmann: Die Polychromie der archaischen und frühklassischen Skulptur (= Studien zur antiken Malerei und Farbgebung. Bd. 5). Biering & Brinkmann, München 2003, ISBN 3-930609-19-3, Kat. Nr. 110
