= Hegias of Athens =

Ancient Greek sculptor

Hegias or Hegesias of Athens (Ancient Greek: Ἡγησίας) was a famous sculptor of Athens, a member of the Late Archaic school of the generation before Pheidias. No surviving work can be securely identified as his, though Pliny mentions a Pyrrhus Supported by Pallas Athena.

Pausanias (8.42.4 and 8.42.10) mentions Hegias as the contemporary of Onatas and of Agelatus of Argos. Lucian of Samosata mentions Hegesias, in common with Kritios and Nesiotes, as belonging to the Archaic school, whose productions were constrained, harsh, stiff and rigid, though accurate in the outline. Quintilian says of Hegesias and Callon that their works were harsh and resembled the Etruscan style. (Smith). Pliny's Natural History (vol. xxxiv.8.19) places Hegias among the rivals of Phidias.
