= Antenor =

6th century BC Athenian sculptor

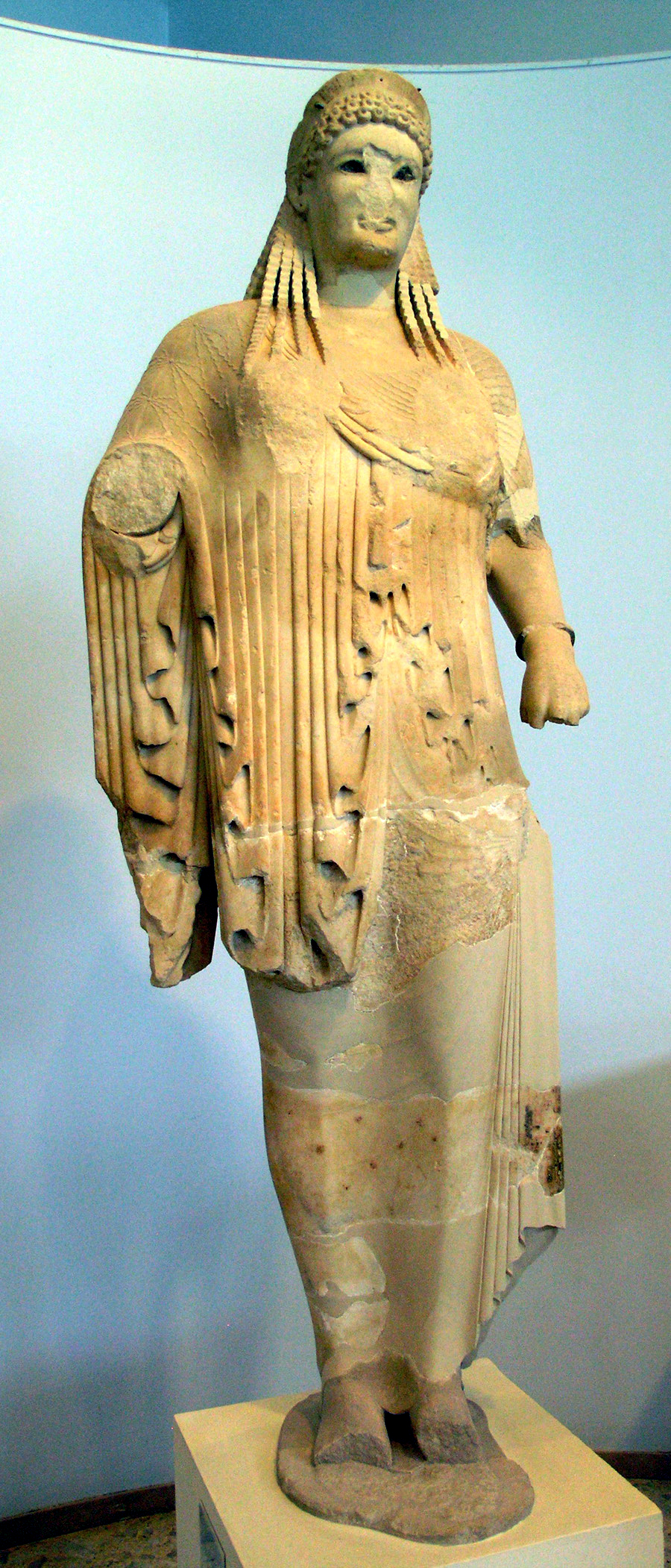

Antenor (Ancient Greek: Ἀντήνωρ, Antḗnōr; fl. c. 540 – c. 500 BC) was an Athenian sculptor. He is recorded as the creator of the joint statues of the tyrannicides Harmodius and Aristogeiton funded by the Athenians on the expulsion of Hippias. These statues were carried away to Susa by Xerxes I of Persia during the Greco-Persian Wars. Archaeologists have also established that a basis signed by "Antenor son of Eumares" belonged to a set of female figures in an archaic style which were displayed in the acropolis. The sculptor of the Harmodius and Aristogeiton is usually listed as the son of Euphranor.

== See also ==
- Harmodius and Aristogeiton
- Harmodius and Aristogeiton in sculpture
- Antenor Kore
- Severe style
- Ancient Greek sculpture
