= Harmodius and Aristogeiton (sculpture) =

Ancient Greek sculpture type

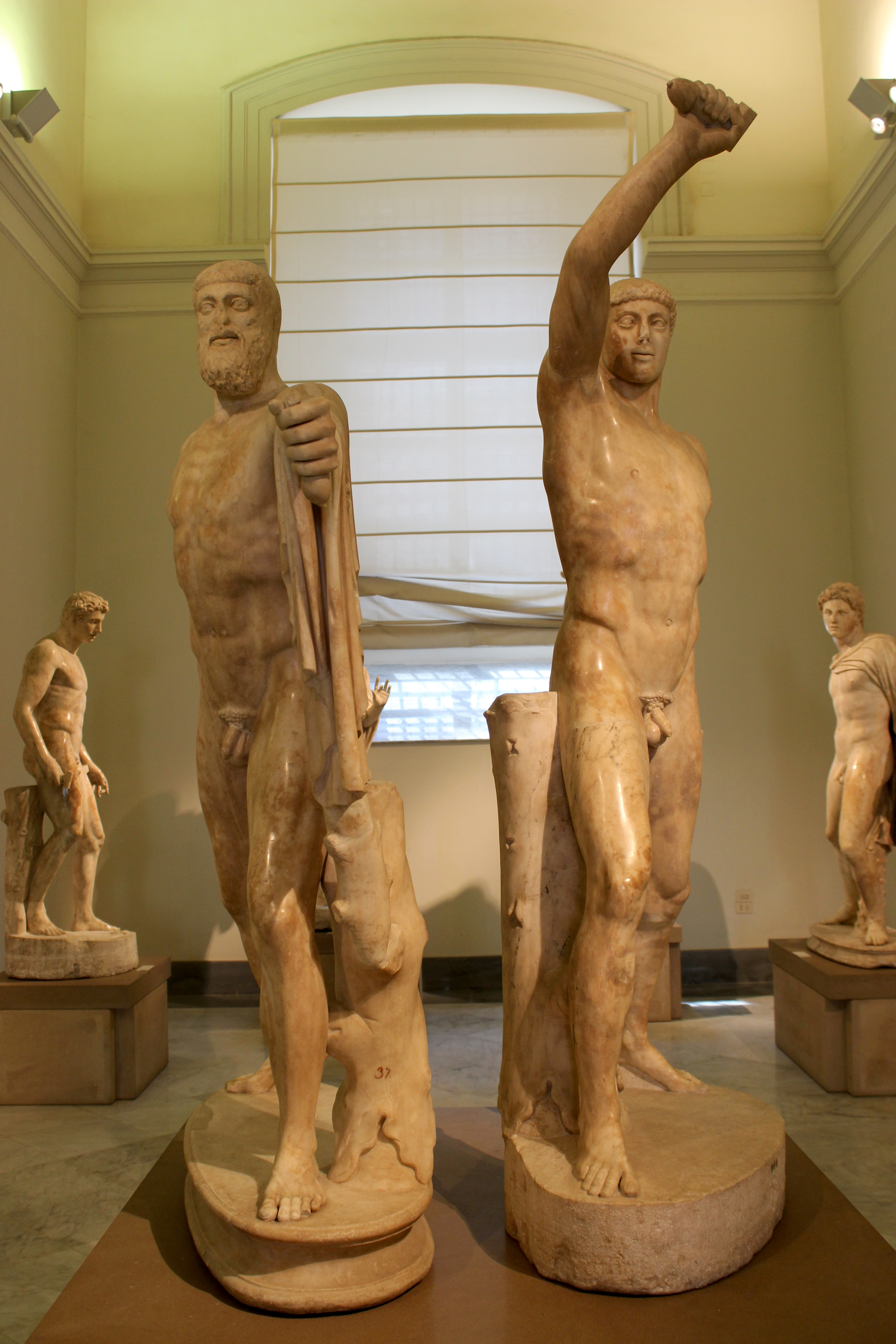
Statue of Harmodius and Aristogeiton, Naples. These are Roman copies of the Athenian originals, now lost

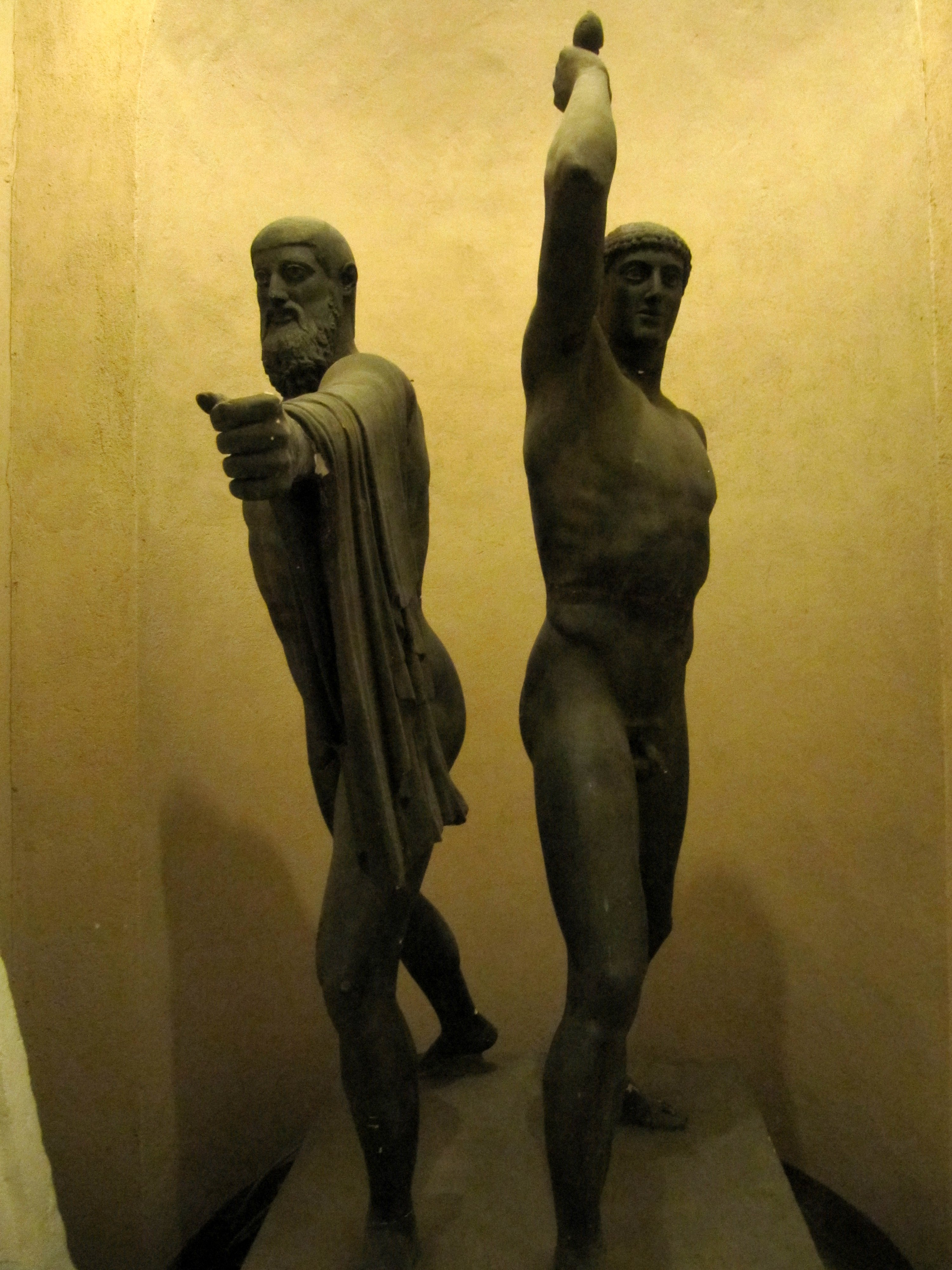
Historical plaster cast by Adolf Michaelis (Gypsothèque de Strasbourg)

A sculptural pairing of the tyrannicides Harmodius and Aristogeiton (Ancient Greek: Ἁρμόδιος καὶ Ἀριστογείτων, romanized: Harmodios, Aristogeitōn) was well known in the ancient world in two major versions but survives only in Roman marble copies. The lovers Harmodius and Aristogeiton were Athenian heroes who assassinated the tyrant Hipparchus in 514 BC.

== History ==
A first version, commissioned from the sculptor Antenor following the establishment of Athenian democracy and erected in the Agora of Athens, was taken by the Persians during their occupation of the city in 480 BC and removed to Susa during the Greco-Persian Wars. Though it was returned to Athens by Alexander the Great (according to Alexander's historian Arrian) or by Seleucus I (according to the Roman writer Valerius Maximus), or again by Antiochus according to Pausanias (1.8.5), it never attracted copyists and is now lost.

To replace the stolen original version, the Athenians commissioned Kritios and Nesiotes to produce a new statue, which was set up in 477/76 BC, according to the inscribed Parian Chronicle. Both pairs stood side-by-side in the Agora as late as the 2nd century AD when Pausanias noted them there. The pair by Kritios and Nesiotes too are now lost, but unlike Antenor's they were extensively copied in Hellenistic and Roman times. The best surviving of those copies may be seen in the National Archaeological Museum in Naples.

== Description ==
In the Neo-Attic style that revived the Severe style of the original bronzes, it shows idealized portraits of the two heroes: a clean-shaven Harmodius, thrusting a sword forward in his upraised right hand, another sword in his left hand; and Aristogeiton, also brandishing a sword, with a chlamys, or cape, draped over his left shoulder. Of the four swords only the hilts are left. The head of Aristogeiton, as well as the left hand and right arm, are not original.

A weathered marble head of Harmodius, once of fine workmanship, conserved at the Metropolitan Museum of Art, with the remains of a strut support on the crown of the head, suggested to Gisela Richter a restoration of the right arm of Harmodius (of which both are missing and restored in the Neapolitan sculpture), reaching backwards, ready for a downward-slashing stroke.

== See also ==
- Riace bronzes
