= Kritios =

Ancient Athenian sculptor (5th cent. BCE)

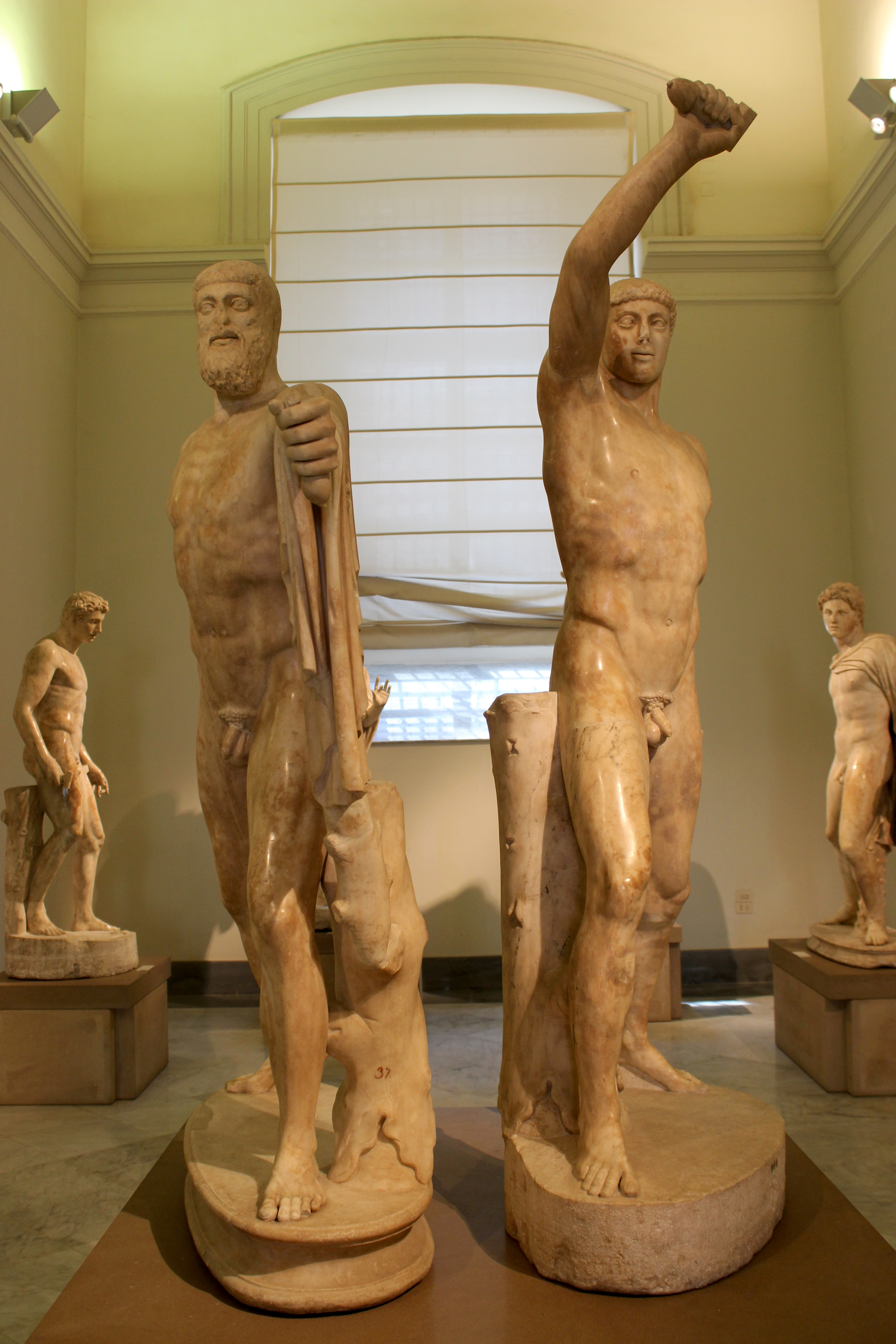
Roman copy of Kritios' Tyrannicides (Archaeological Museum, Naples).

Kritios (Ancient Greek: Κριτίος, /krɪˈtiːəs/) was an Athenian sculptor, probably a pupil of Antenor, working in the early 5th century BCE, whose manner is on the cusp of the Late Archaic and the Severe style of Early Classicism in Attica. He was the teacher of Myron. With Nesiotes (Νησιώτης,) Kritios made the replacement of the Tyrannicides ("Tyrant-killers") group by Antenor, which had been carried off by the Persians in the first stage of the Greco-Persian Wars. The new group stood in the Agora of Athens and its composition is known from Roman copies.

With Nesiotes Kritios made other statues, of bronze, dedicated on the Acropolis, of which only their inscribed bases remain to give testament. The head of a marble statue found on the Acropolis so much resembles the copies of one of the Tyrannicides – Harmodius – that it has been called the Kritios Boy (now in the Acropolis Museum). Its easy naturalism and relaxed contrapposto set it apart from the Late Archaic conventional kouroi that preceded it. It was re-discovered too late (1865) to have had an effect on Neoclassical sculpture, as it would have done if it had been known a century earlier.

== See also ==
- Harmodius and Aristogeiton (sculpture)
