= Severe style =

Term for a period of Greek sculpture

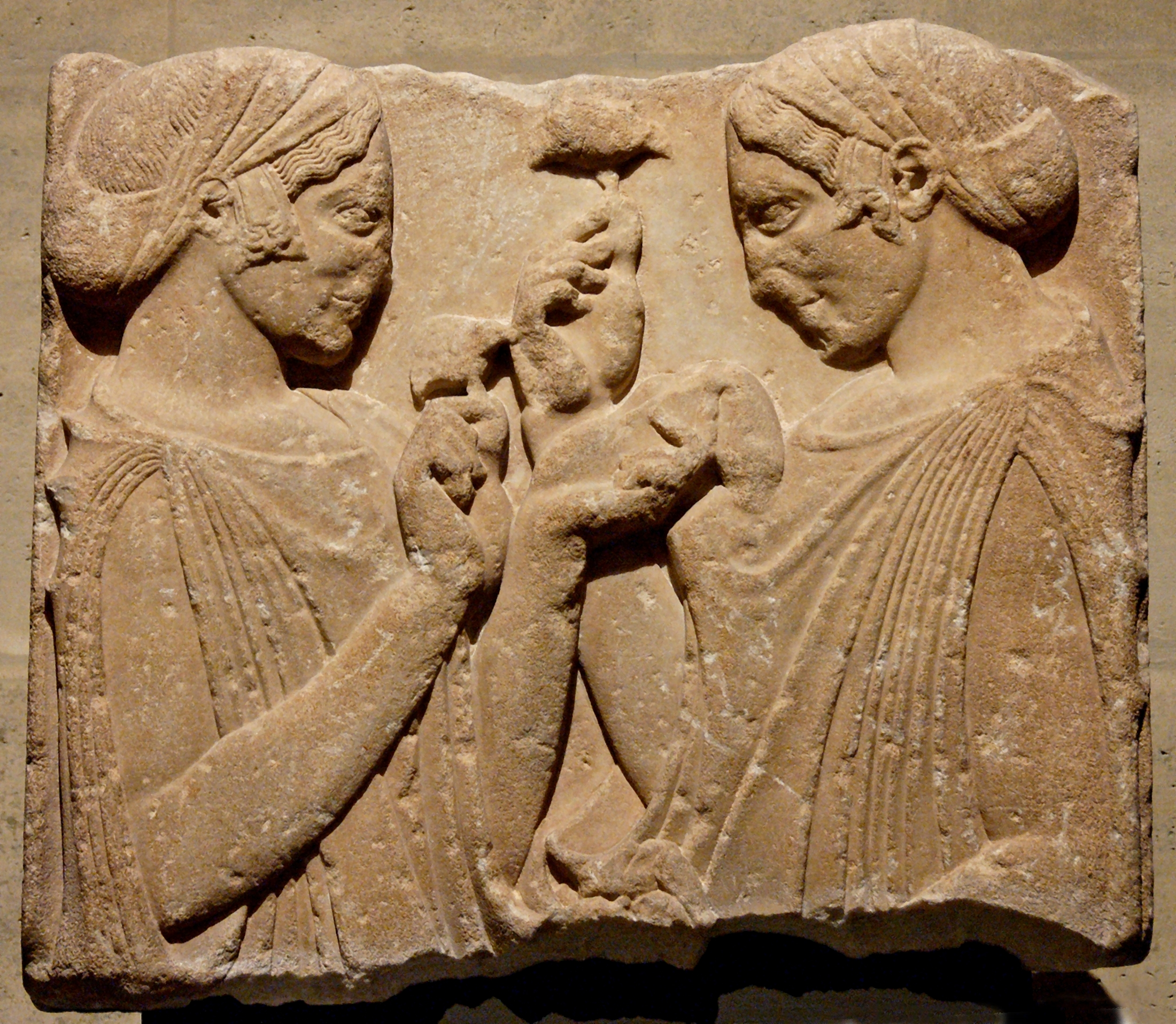
Pharsalos stele, c. 470–460 BCE, Louvre

The Severe style, or Early Classical style, was the dominant idiom of Greek sculpture in the period ca. 490 to 450 BCE. It marks the breakdown of the canonical forms of archaic art and the transition to the greatly expanded vocabulary and expression of the classical moment of the late 5th century. It was an international style found at many cities in the Hellenic world and in a variety of media including: bronze sculpture in the round, stelae, and architectural relief. The style perhaps realized its greatest fulfillment in the metopes of the Temple of Zeus, Olympia.

The term severe style was coined by Gustav Kramer in his Über den Styl und die Herkunft der bemahlten griechischen Thongefäße ("On the style and the origins of painted Greek pottery", 1837, Berlin) in reference to the first generation of red figure vase painters; since Vagn Poulsen's 1937 study Der strenge Stil ("The Severe Style"), the name has become exclusively associated with sculpture.

== Dating and relative chronology ==
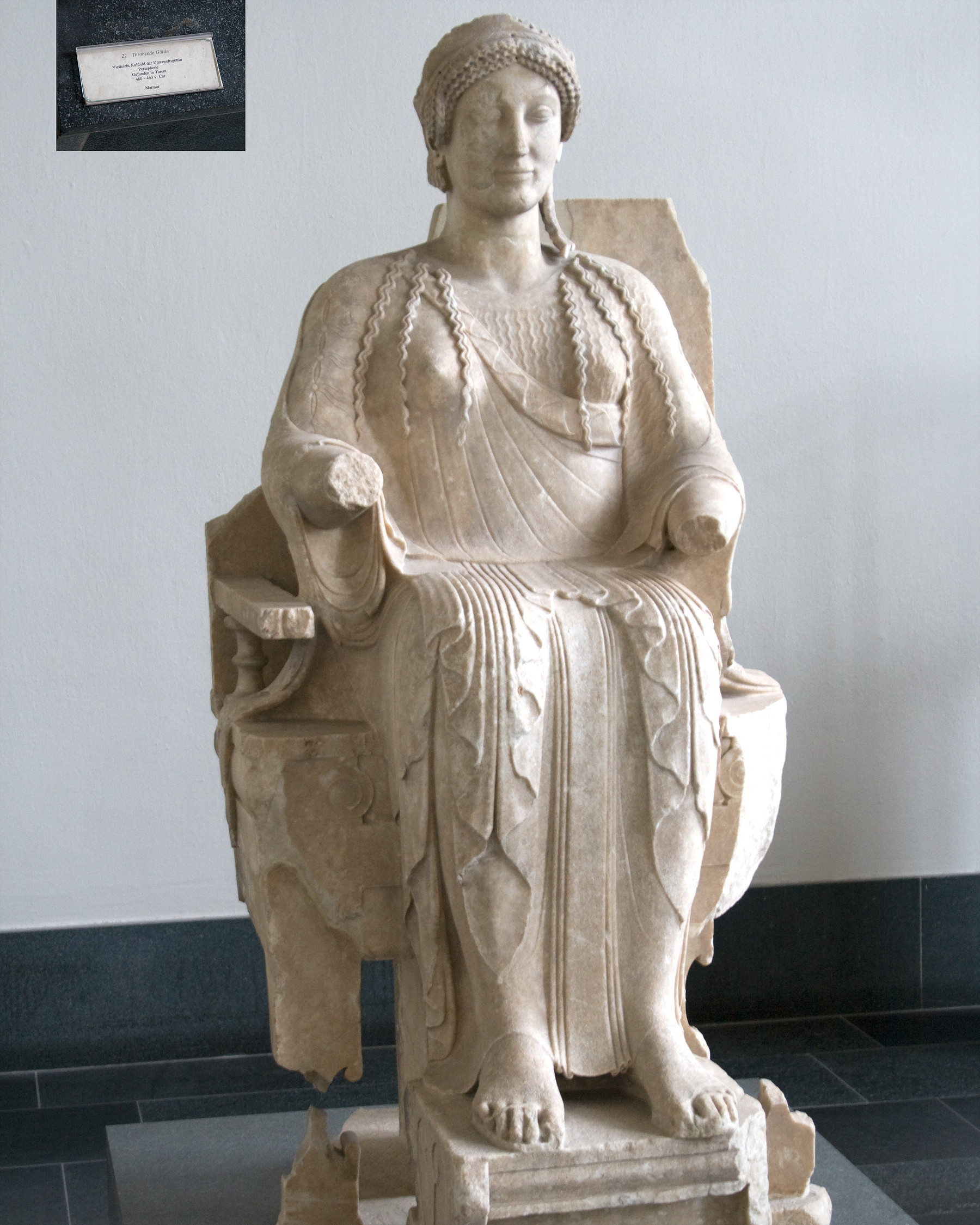
Taranto goddess, Pergamon Museum.

There is no firm chronology for the Severe style, the dating of early 5th century BCE sculpture is approximate and consequently its first appearance has been conjectured to be at some point between 525 and 480 BCE. The one exception to this general rule of uncertainty is the Tyrannicide group; a replacement for the bronze created by Antenor in 514 to commemorate the assassins of the tyrant Hipparchus was sculpted by Kritios and Nesiotes and dated in an inscription of 477/6 BCE. This piece, now known only from Roman copies preserves the poses and facial features familiar from archaic art and combines it with a novel treatment of multiple viewpoints, feeling for mass, and anatomical observation that distinguishes it as one of several Athenian transitional works. Another is the Kritian boy, c. 480 BCE, whose distribution of weight onto one leg, lowered right hip, and inclination of head and shoulders exceeds the formulas of the late Archaic kouroi marks a step toward the greater naturalism and individualization of the Classical – as B. S. Ridgway puts it: no longer a type but a subject.

== General characteristics ==
The depredations of war and the sumptuary laws of Solon ensured that very little sculpture was practiced at Athens in the first half of the 5th century. Instead, we have to look to other cities to trace the development of the Severe style. We can observe the general characteristics of the period on its greatest masterpiece, the Temple of Zeus in Olympia, attributed to the Olympia Master. Here we find a simplicity of forms, especially in dress and the absence of decoration, a feeling of heaviness both in the gravity of the body and the "doughy" cloth of the peplos. Indeed, this era sees a shift from the use of the Doric chiton to the Ionic peplos whose irregular groupings and folds better express the contours of the underlying body. One can also witness on the pediments of the temple the slight pout typical of this time where the upper lip projects a little over the lower and a volume to the eyelids, a striking departure from the fixed Archaic smile of the 6th century and suggestive perhaps of the brooding pathos also typical of the idiom. There is further experimentation with the expression of emotion on the metopes of the temple depicting the labors of Herakles, an experiment not pursued by later Classical art.

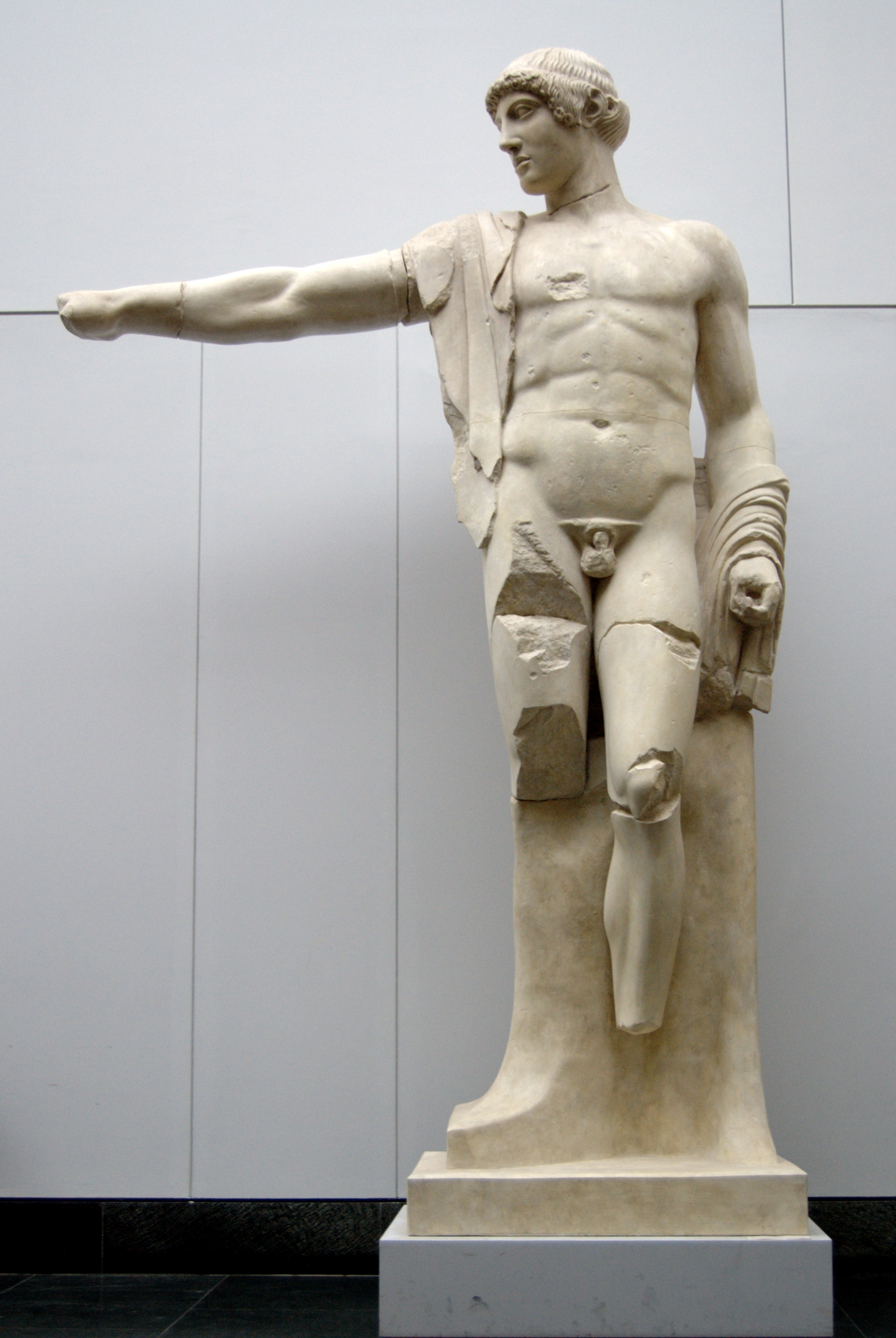
Cast of Apollo from Temple of Zeus, Olympia, original attributed to the Olympia Master, cast in the MFA Munich

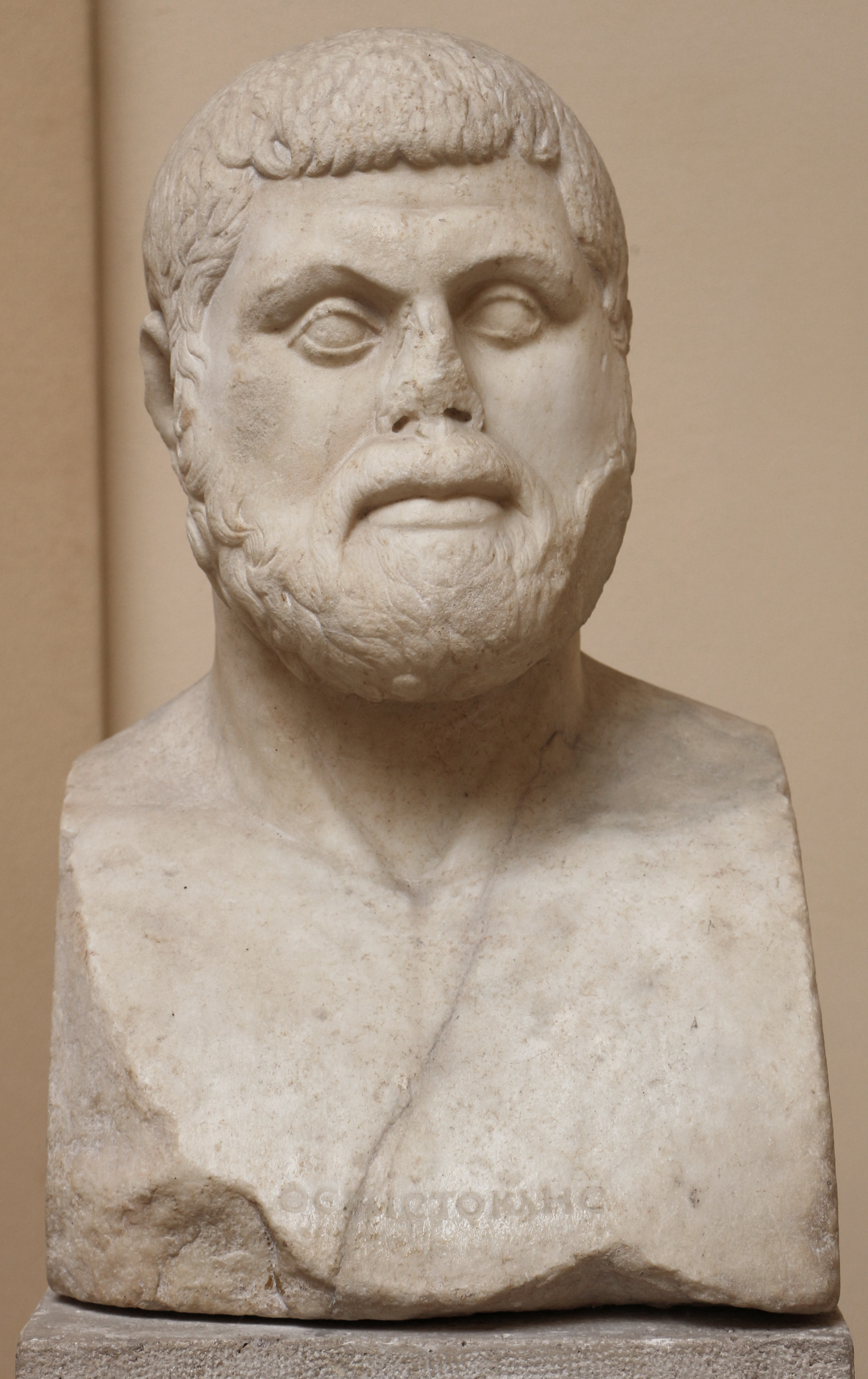
A Roman-era bust of Themistocles in "Severe style", based on a Greek original, in the Museo Archeologico Ostiense, Ostia, Rome, Italy. The lost original of this bust, dated to circa 470 BC, has been described as "the first true portrait of an individual European".

Brunilde S. Ridgway identifies six traits that might serve to define the style:

1. A certain simplicity or severity of forms, visible in both facial features and the treatment of drapery; a heaviness of traits in open contrast to the lighter features of archaic sculpture; a feeling for the tectonics of the human body which conceives of each figure as composed of certain basic structural sections, as contrasted with the lack of articulation and the emphasis on outlines in archaic statuary. More especially, in the human face the eyelids acquire volume, often appearing as thick rims around the eyes, and chins become particularly heavy; cloth also is made to look heavier and "doughy."
  The Severe period owes its name to this most evident of all its traits. Contrary to the decorative approach of archaic sculptors, who multiplied details and fractioned into a variety of patterns the basic unity of single garments, Severe artists proceeded as if by a process of elimination, thereby focusing emphasis on the few elements retained. From this point of view the term Severe describes the style more accurately than the terms transitional or early classical, which stress continuity rather than difference.
2. A change in drapery, readily apparent in two forms: (a) a shift from Ionic to Doric fashions; (b) a change in the treatment of the folds, so that the final effect resembles corrugated iron.
3. A change in subject matter. One aspect of this phenomenon is an increase in characterization. The basic Kouros type now becomes sharply differentiated into either Apollo or a human being, and the difference no longer rests on the attributes held by the statue. Apollo is recognizable not only through a certain grandeur or ethos (one of those intangible elements in Greek art which are so difficult to pinpoint but with which one has inevitably to reckon), but mostly because he now wears his hair long while the contemporary athlete has his short.
4. Interest in emotion. The increase in characterization, with its potential for narrative, is obviously accompanied by an interest in the mechanics of expression. The range goes from quiet brooding to worried forethought to physical distress, and ends with the uncontrollable muscular distortions of death.
5. Interest in motion. Emotions or physical distress are usually dependent upon strain or action. Characterization has led to narrative. Thus traits 3 and 4 combine to produce a series of "statues in motion." This feature is not wholly dependent upon the demand for athletic sculpture nor can it be considered a total innovation of the Severe period since figures in action had already appeared during the archaic phase.
6. The predominant use of bronze.

== Individual masters ==
The Severe artists whose names have come down to us include the collaborators Kritios and Nesiotes; Pythagoras; Calamis; and most notably Myron of Eleutherae. Myron was a late practitioner of the style active in the 450s and 440s and the author of two identifiable sculptures that have survived in copies: his Discobolus and the Athena Marsyas group. Both seemingly original in composition, these works capture several of the chief characteristics of the style in its feeling for the dramatic moment, its rhythm and balance of masses, and the embodiment of feeling through the pregnant gesture.

Why this naturalizing trend should emerge in early fifth-century Greek art has been a matter of much scholarly speculation. Renate Thomas summarizes the contending views thus:

The significance of the Late Archaic period remains unclear. Is it already a response to the awakening sense of personal value, which will then be held back during the Severe Style through a self-imposed discipline (Schefold), or has there developed, since the Late Archaic period, a new and freer spirit, which, however, becomes clearly visible only in the Severe or even in the Classical style (G. v. Lucken, E. Langlotz, B. Schweitzer)? Did the "Discovery of the Mind" in the sixth century produce two different effects (Schachermeyr), one of which produces new sets of laws through reflection upon traditional norms? Or does only the strong freedom of movement in the figurative art of the Late Archaic period, the self-confident recognition of personal individuality, go back to a change in the sixth century, while the causes of the "purified world of forms" of the Severe Style are others?

== Selected works ==
- "Aspasia" (copy) orig. c.460-50 (Berlin (E) K.166+167:605)
- Athena Giustiniani
- Athena and Marsyas group
- Blond Kouros's Head of the Acropolis c.480 (Athens 689)
- Borgia stele c.470 (Naples 98)
- Bronze athlete c.470 (Mt Holyoke Coll. BOI.I.1926)
- Bronze athlete holding ball c.460 (Berlin misc.8089)
- Bronze Head c.460 (Athens 6590)
- Bronze head from Porticello c.450 (Reggio)
- Bronze Poseidon from Kreusis c.460 (Athens Br. 11761)
- Charioteer of Delphi
- Chatsworth Head
- Choiseul-Gouffier Apollo
- Diskobolos
- Dodona Zeus
- Dove Stele,
- Eros Soranzo (copy) orig. c. 460 (St. Petersberg 85)
- Esquiline Venus (1st-century AD Roman copy of a Greek original)
- Euthydikos Kore
- Grave Stele of Pollis
- Guistiniani Hestia
- Harmodius and Aristogeiton
- Head of Athena from Aegina c.460-50 (Paris 3109)
- Heracles (copy) orig. c.450-40 (Oxford 1928)
- Kassel Apollo
- Kritios Boy c.490-80 (Athens 3938)
- Lemnian Athena
- "Leonidas" c.475 (Athens 3613)
- Ludovisi Throne
- Ludovisi peplophoros (copy) orig. c. 470-60 (Rome Terme 8577)
- Metopes and pediments of the Temple of Zeus Olympia, accredited to the Olympia Master
- Metopes of temple E at Selinunte
- Motya charioteer
- Mourning Athena
- Omphalos Apollo
- Parthenon metopes
- Pediment of the Temple of Aphaea, Aegina
- Perseus head (copy) Rome Conservatori
- Pharsalos stele c.470-60 (Paris 701)
- Artemision Bronze
- Riace bronzes
- Taranto goddess
- Tiber Apollo (copy) orig. c.450 (Rome Terme 608)
- Zeus Ganymede group

== Bibliography ==
- Vagn Häger Poulsen: Der strenge Stil. Studien zur Geschichte der griechischen Plastik 480-450, Kopenhagen 1937
- V. Knigge, Bewegte Figuren. Figuren d. Großplastik im Strengen Stil, Diss. München 1965
- F. Schachermeyr, Die frühe Klassik der Griechen, Stuttgart 1966
- B. Sismondo Ridgway, The Severe Style in Greek Sculpture, Princeton, N. J. 1970
- R. Tölle-Kastenbein, Frühklassische Peplosfiguren, Mainz 1980
- R. Thomas, Athletenstatuetten der Spätarchaik und des Strengen Stils., Rome 1981
- R. R. Holloway, '"The Severe Style, New Evidence and Old Problems", in: Numismatica e antichità classiche, Quaderni Ticinesi 17, 1988.
