= Olympia Master =

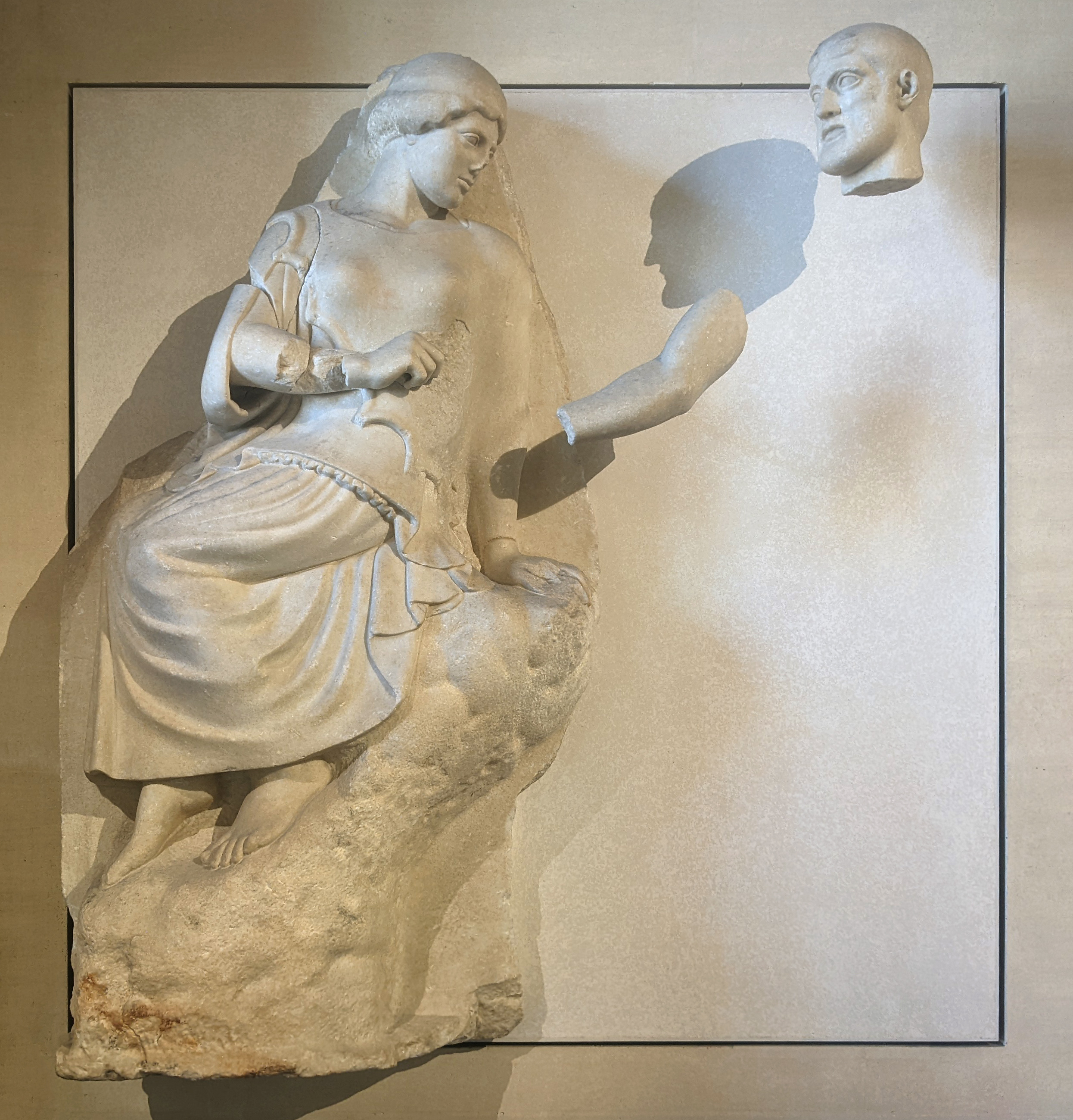
Herakles at Lake Stymphalia, metope from the Temple of Zeus, Olympia, Louvre.

The Olympia Master is the name given to the anonymous sculptor responsible for the external sculpture of the Temple of Zeus, Olympia. From what Pausanias tells us of the dates of the Temple, the Master and his workshop were active between 470 and 457 BC. The two pediments and the series of metopes ascribed to him are the paradigmatic expression of the Early Classical or Severe style of 5th century Greek sculpture.

The site of the sanctuary was first systematically excavated by a French team in 1829 then the German expedition headed by Georg Treu from 1875–81, and the results published in a five volume report by Ernst Curtius and Friedrich Adler, Olympia: Die Ergebnisse der von dem deutschen Reich veranstalteten Ausgrabung, 1892-7. The building and sculpture had been shattered by an earthquake in antiquity and subsequently partially reused as building material, the rest buried under alluvial mud. The early classical sculptures did not initially attract as much attention as the later works such as the Nike of Paionios. Since the first reconstruction of the pediments by Treu in 1897 and the rejection of Pausanias's ascription to Paionios of Mende and Alkamenes on grounds of chronology the temple decoration is now commonly attributed to the putative Olympia Master, one amongst a studio of five sculptors.

The two gable ends and metopes exhibit a stylistic unity of strong rhythms and simple planes. The dress of the figures has not yet reached the naturalism of the mature classical, yet in the temple sculptures there is evidence of an experimentation not pursued by the younger Greek sculptors. The Olympia Master's work achieves a complexity of emotion that exceeds the conventions of the archaic; we find pathos, hubris, tension, exhaustion, disgust – markedly so in his characterization of Heracles, nuances lost to the idealised art of the later 5th century. The east pediment represents Pelops’s race against Oinomaos for the hand of Hippodamia, seemingly at the moment of the oath of the two contestants before Zeus himself. On the west we find Theseus and Perithoos fighting the Centaurs at the point of greatest violence in contrast to the instant of duplicitous tension on the east. Apollon in the center of the west pediment.

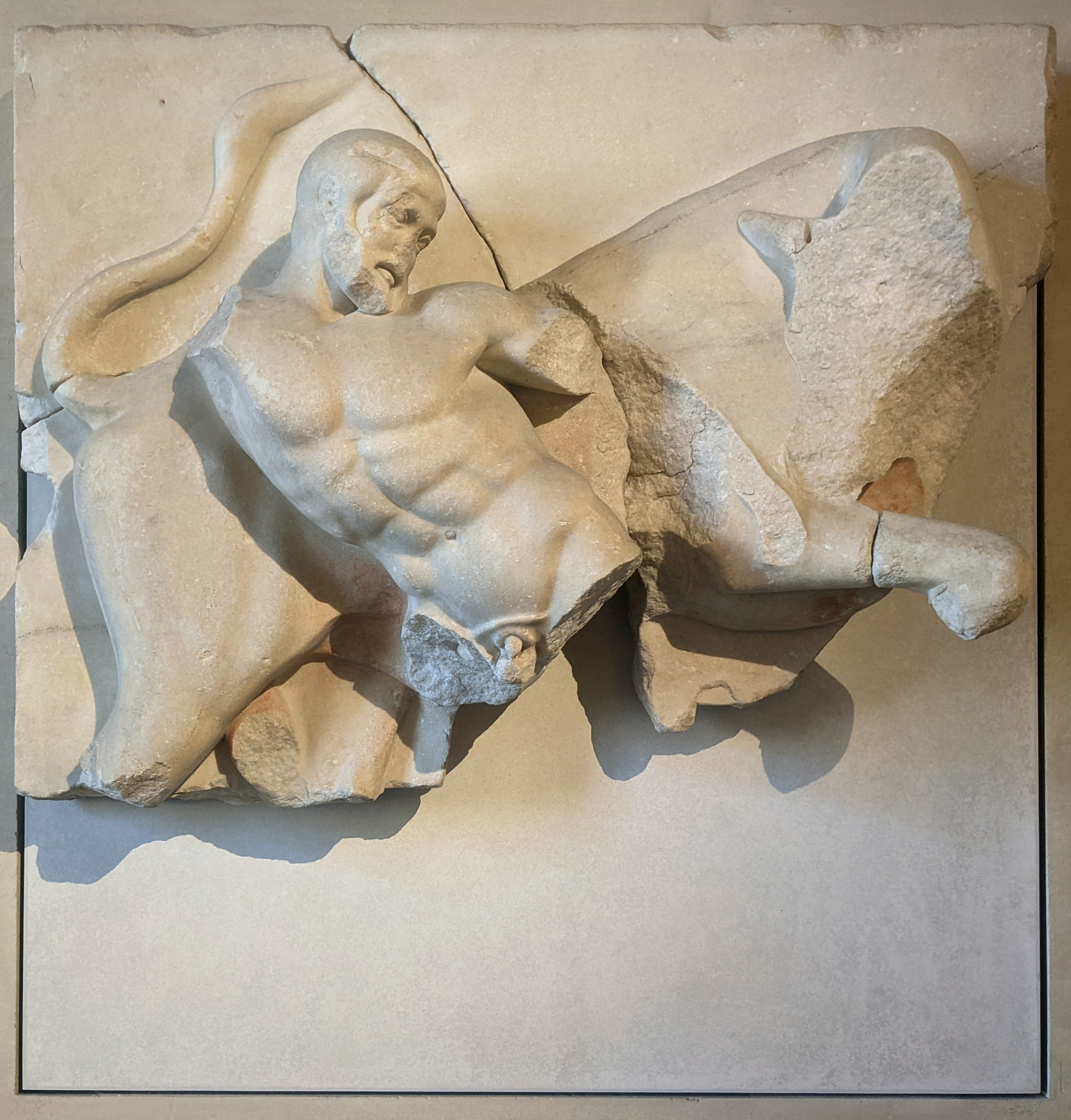
Heracles and the Cretan Bull: fourth metope over the West porch, ca 460 BC.

The metopes depict the twelve Labours of Hercules, a figure of singular importance to the temple, as it was he, a son of Zeus, who according to legend marked out the sanctuary and instituted the Olympic Games. Traces of colour have been found on the sculpture and a case has been made that some of the detailing was painted on. The arrangement of the pediments remains a matter of dispute, and the subject of no fewer than 59 conjectured restorations. The pediments are sculpted in the round albeit dowelled on to the pediment background and most backs are unfinished; some are hollow, presumably to save weight. They are of Parian marble with a few of the heads in Pentelic marble, notably the heroes wear Attic and not Peloponnesian helmets. Several of the heads of the pediment figures have unworked bosses suggesting that a pointing process was used from clay or wood models, it is highly unusual to find traces of technique on work of the era.

The architectural decoration of Zeus's temple is perhaps the only major monument from a significant studio of the Severe period to survive; consequently it is taken to be the summation of the Severe style from which other works in the idiom beg comparison. Several regional styles have been suggested as an origin for the artist including the Ionian, Peloponnesian and Laconian.

== Sources ==
- Jose Dorig, The Olympia Master and His Collaborators, 1997.
- H. V. Herman, Die Olympia-Skulpturen, 1987.
- Bernard Ashmole, Nikolaos Yalouris, Olympia and the Sculptures of the Temple of Zeus, 1967.
- Bernard Ashmole, Architect and Sculptor in Classical Greece.
- John Boardman, Greek Sculpture: The Classical Period.
- R. Ross Holloway, The Master of Olympia: the Documentary Evidence, 2000
- A. Stewart, Greek Sculpture 1990.
- Ernst Curtius, Die Ausgrabungen zu Olympia, 1875-6
