= Léon-Jean-Joseph Dubois =

French archaeologist & illustrator (1780–1846)

- Born: 1780
- Died: 1846 (aged 65–66)
- Known for: First archaeological excavations in Olympia, Greece; Discovery of the temple of Olympian Zeus
- Notable work: Illustration of the Egyptian Pantheon of Jean-François Champollion
- Elected: Curator at the Louvre Museum
- Patrons: Antoine-Jean Gros; Jacques-Louis David; Jean-François Champollion

Léon-Jean-Joseph Dubois (1780-1846) was a French illustrator and lithographer, also an archaeologist and curator at the Louvre museum.

== Life ==
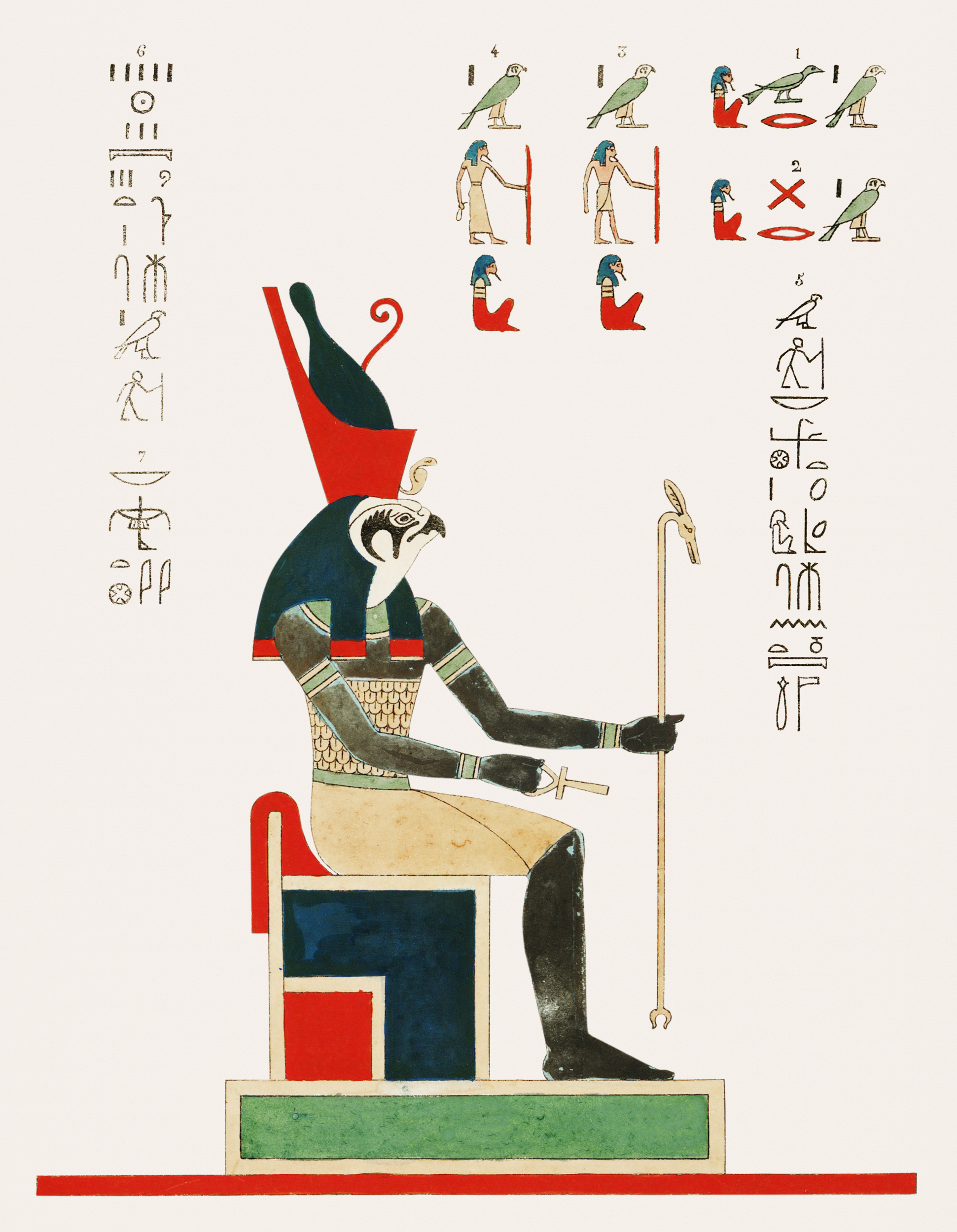
Egyptian God Horus (in Pantheon Egyptien illustrated by Dubois)

Léon-Jean-Joseph Dubois studied fine arts and painting in the ateliers of painters Antoine-Jean Gros and Jacques-Louis David in Paris. He became then a designer and lithographer.

In 1823, he became acquainted with the well-known Egyptologist Jean-François Champollion, who introduced him to the Egyptian art, and who chose him later to illustrate his work, the Egyptian Pantheon.

In 1826, Dubois travelled to Italy, accompanied by Champollion and Italian archaeologist Ippolito Rosellini. The same year, following the creation by "the ordinance of May 15" of the conservation of antiques (known as Charles X Museum) at the Louvre museum, Champollion was appointed curator of the Egyptian and Oriental division of the Louvre, while Dubois was appointed assistant curator.

In December 1828, Dubois was charged by the Institut de France to head the section of Archaeology of the scientific expedition of Morea, which was sent to Greece at the end of the Greek War of Independence. Dubois and his colleague Abel Blouet (from the section of Architecture and Sculpture) arrived in Peloponnese in March 1829 and both led the first archaeological excavations ever carried out in the ancient city of Messene founded in 369 BC by Epaminondas. Dubois spent a full month in the ancient city, starting on 10 April.

On 10 May 1829, Dubois and Blouet went to the ancient sanctuary of Olympia, where they spent six weeks. They undertook, there as well, the first excavations ever made on the archaeological site and we owe Dubois the discovery of the temple of Olympian Zeus. Dubois and Blouet were accompanied by painters Frédéric de Gournay, Pierre Achille Poirot, Pierre Félix Trézel and Amaury-Duval, and by a troop of more than a hundred workers. Historian Edgar Quinet, who was also part of the Archaeology section, did not contribute to the excavations, as he already had left the section to continue his exploration of Greece alone.

The painter Amaury-Duval gave in his Souvenirs (1829-1830) a detailed description of Dubois and his team during the Morea expedition.

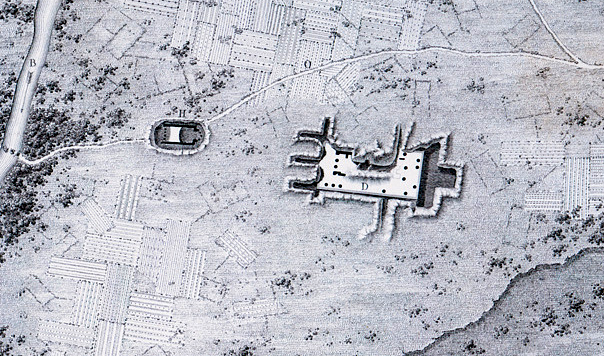
Map of the first archaeological excavations in ancient Olympia by the expedition of Morea in May 1829, with the temple of Olympian Zeus (by Guillaume-Abel Blouet and Pierre Achille Poirot)

== Bibliography ==
- Panthéon égyptien, collection des personnages mythologiques de l'ancienne Égypte, d'après les monuments / avec un texte explicatif, par M. J.-F. Champollion le jeune; et les fig., d'après les dessins de M. L.-J.-J. Dubois par M. Jean-François Champollion, Paris, imprimerie Firmin Didot, 1823.
- Souvenirs (1829-1830) par M. Eugène Emmanuel Amaury Duval, Librairie Plon, E. Plon, Nourrit et Cie, imprimeurs-éditeurs, Paris, 1885.
- De la Grèce moderne, et de ses rapports avec l'antiquité par M. Edgar Quinet, F.G. Levrault, Paris, 1830.
- Volume I: Expedition scientifique de Morée: ordonnée par le Gouvernement Français; Architecture, Sculptures, Inscriptions et Vues du Péloponèse, des Cyclades et de l'Attique Abel Blouet, Amable Ravoisié, Achille Poirot, Félix Trézel et Frédéric de Gournay, Firmin Didot, Paris, 1831.
- Volume II: Expedition scientifique de Morée: ordonnée par le Gouvernement Français; Architecture, Sculptures, Inscriptions et Vues du Péloponèse, des Cyclades et de l'Attique Abel Blouet, Amable Ravoisié, Achille Poirot, Félix Trézel et Frédéric de Gournay, Firmin Didot, Paris, 1833.
- Volume III: Expedition scientifique de Morée: ordonnée par le Gouvernement Français; Architecture, Sculptures, Inscriptions et Vues du Péloponèse, des Cyclades et de l'Attique Abel Blouet, Amable Ravoisié, Achille Poirot, Félix Trézel et Frédéric de Gournay, Firmin Didot, Paris, 1838.
- Yiannis Saïtas et al., L'œuvre de l'expédition scientifique de Morée 1829-1838, Edited by Yiannis Saïtas, Editions Melissa, 2011 (1st Part) - 2017 (2nd Part).
- Marie-Noëlle Bourguet, Bernard Lepetit, Daniel Nordman, Maroula Sinarellis, L’Invention scientifique de la Méditerranée. Égypte, Morée, Algérie., Éditions de l’EHESS, 1998. (ISBN 2-7132-1237-5)
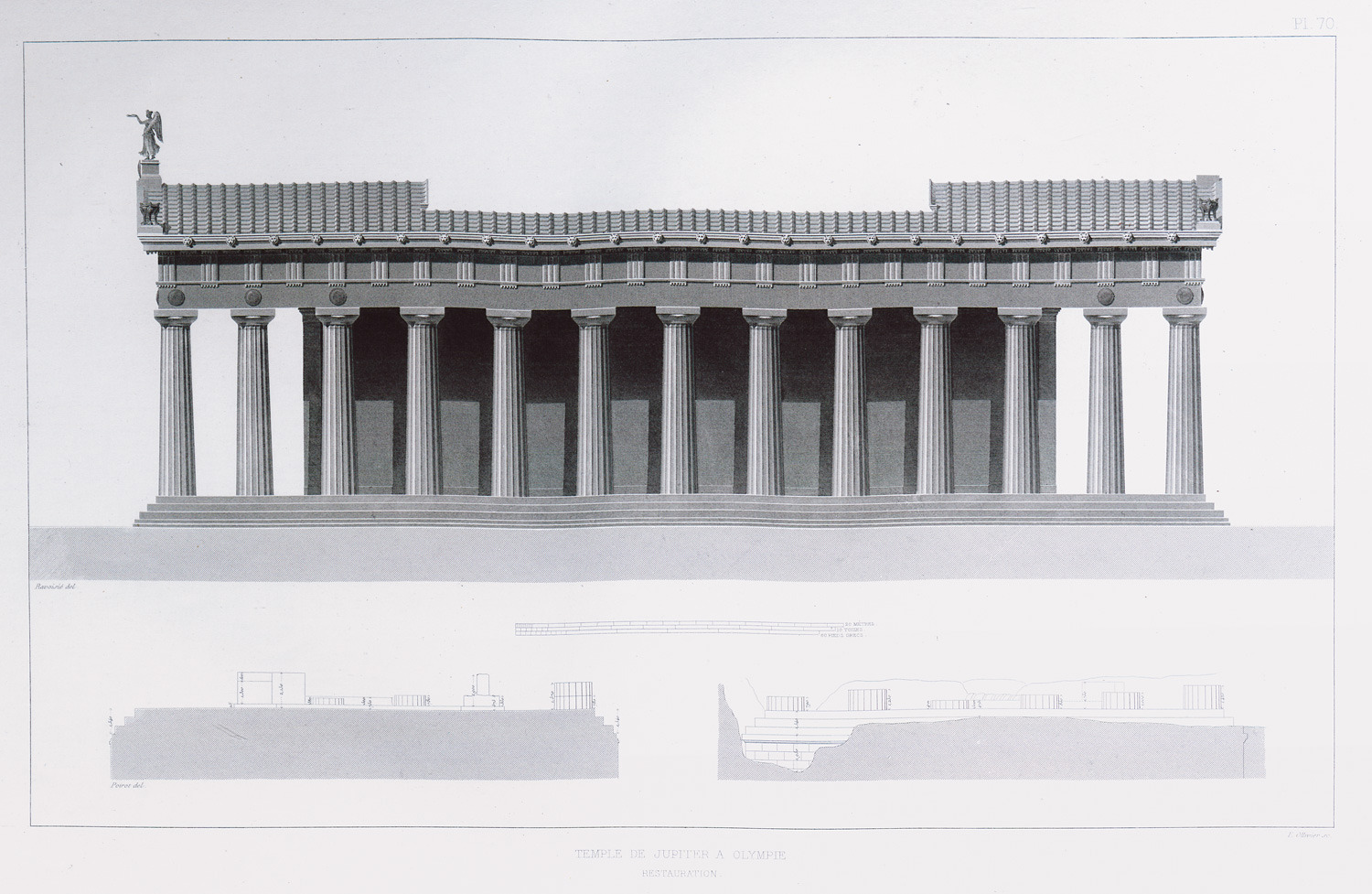
  Plan of the temple of Zeus at Olympia (by Guillaume-Abel Blouet)

== Annexes ==
- Notice d'autorité de la Bibliothèque nationale de France
