= Libon (architect) =

Ancient Greek architect

Libon was a 5th-century BC architect of Ancient Greece. Born in Elis, he built the Doric Temple of Zeus at Olympia in about 460 BC.
