= Apollon of Olympia =

Ancient Greek sculpture discovered in Olympia

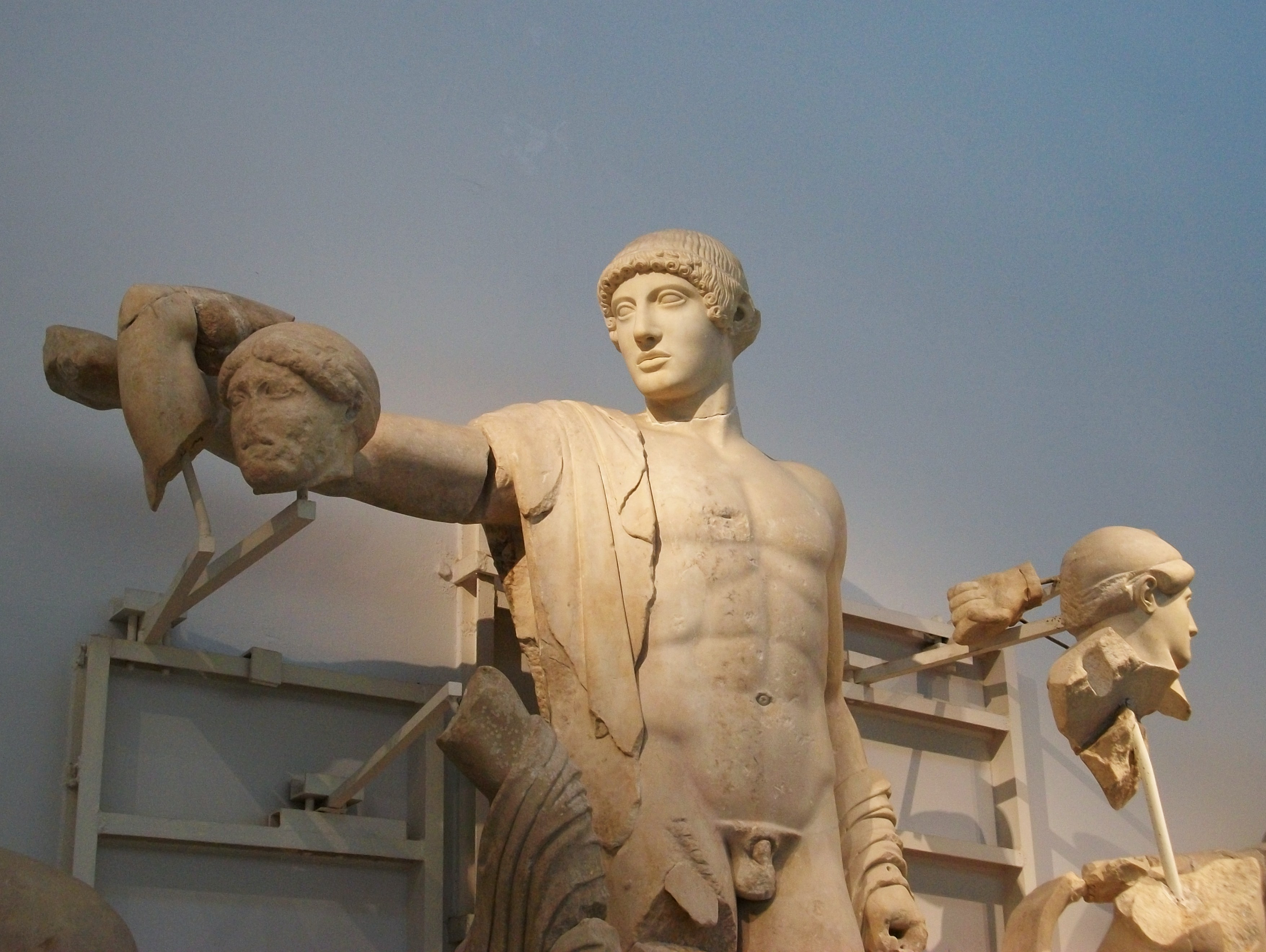
Apollon of Olympia

The Apollon of Olympia was part of the group of sculptures found in the west pediment of the Temple of Zeus at Olympia. Its original location also provides it with another name: the Apollon from the west pediment. It is one of the most important statues of the Severe style or early Classical style, dating from ca. 460 BCE. The statue is currently in the Archaeological Museum of Olympia.

The sculptures of the west pediment depicted the battle of the Lapiths against the Centaurs, following the wedding feast of Peirithous and Hippodamia. The battle of the Lapiths (legendary inhabitants of Thessaly) against the Centaurs (wild forest inhabitants with a human upper half and the body of a horse) frequently acted as a mythological metaphor for the conflicts between the Greeks and the Barbarians. Most of the figures in this turbulent battle scene were discovered during the German excavations of 1875, led by the archaeologist Georg Treu.

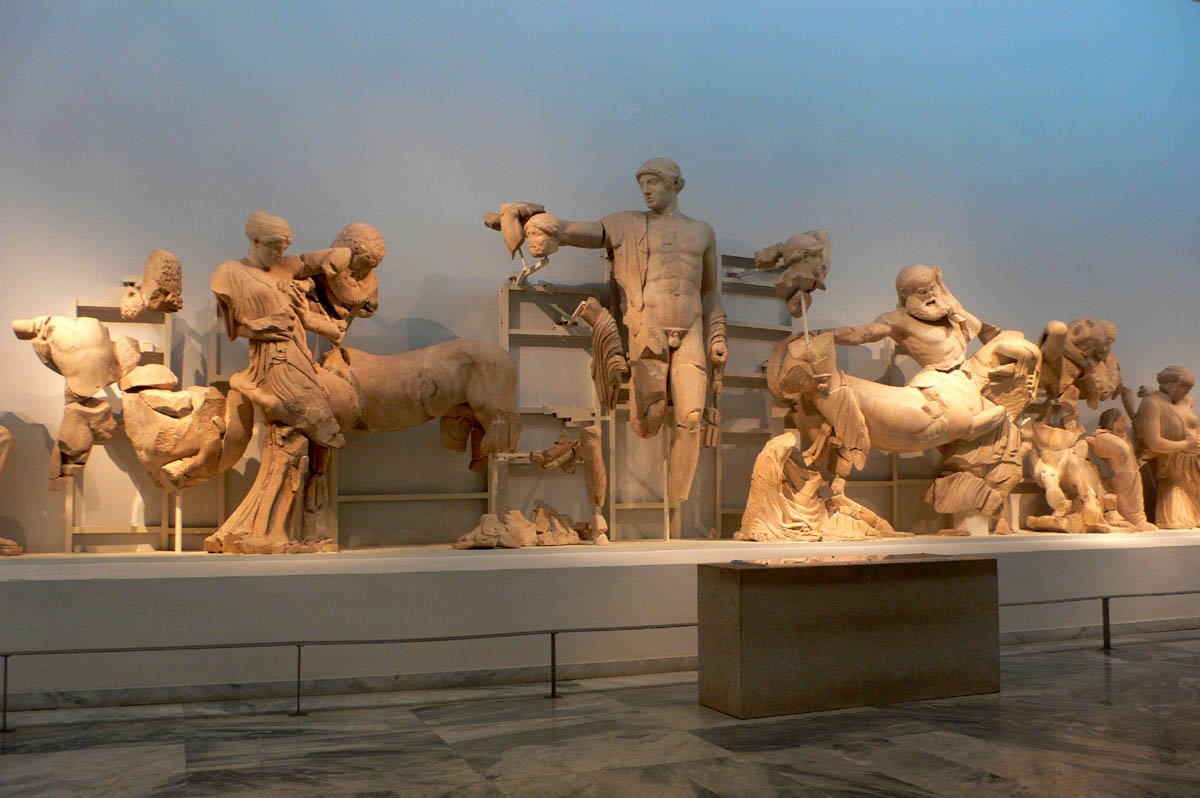

The juvenile Apollo stood in the centre of the pediment, directing his gaze toward the Lapiths. With his outstretched right arm, he seemed to order an end to the iniquity: the Centaurs had betrayed the Lapiths' hospitality, drunk to excess, and kidnapped their women. Nevertheless, his inclusion appears to be merely figurative; the combatants seem ignorant of his presence, with no other figure in the pediment referring, either in their motion or gesture, to the appearance of the god.

The back of the sculpture, which had not been visible to viewers, is notable for being more roughly worked than the front. This difference has provided modern scholars with information on the methods used by Ancient Greek sculptors, and contributed to the debate regarding whether the later Hermes of Olympia is an original Greek sculpture, or a Roman copy.

== Sources ==
- "Olympia, Zeustempel, Westgiebel, Apollon" (in German). Virtuelles Antikenmuseum Göttingen.
