= Athena Marsyas Group =

Sculpture by Myron

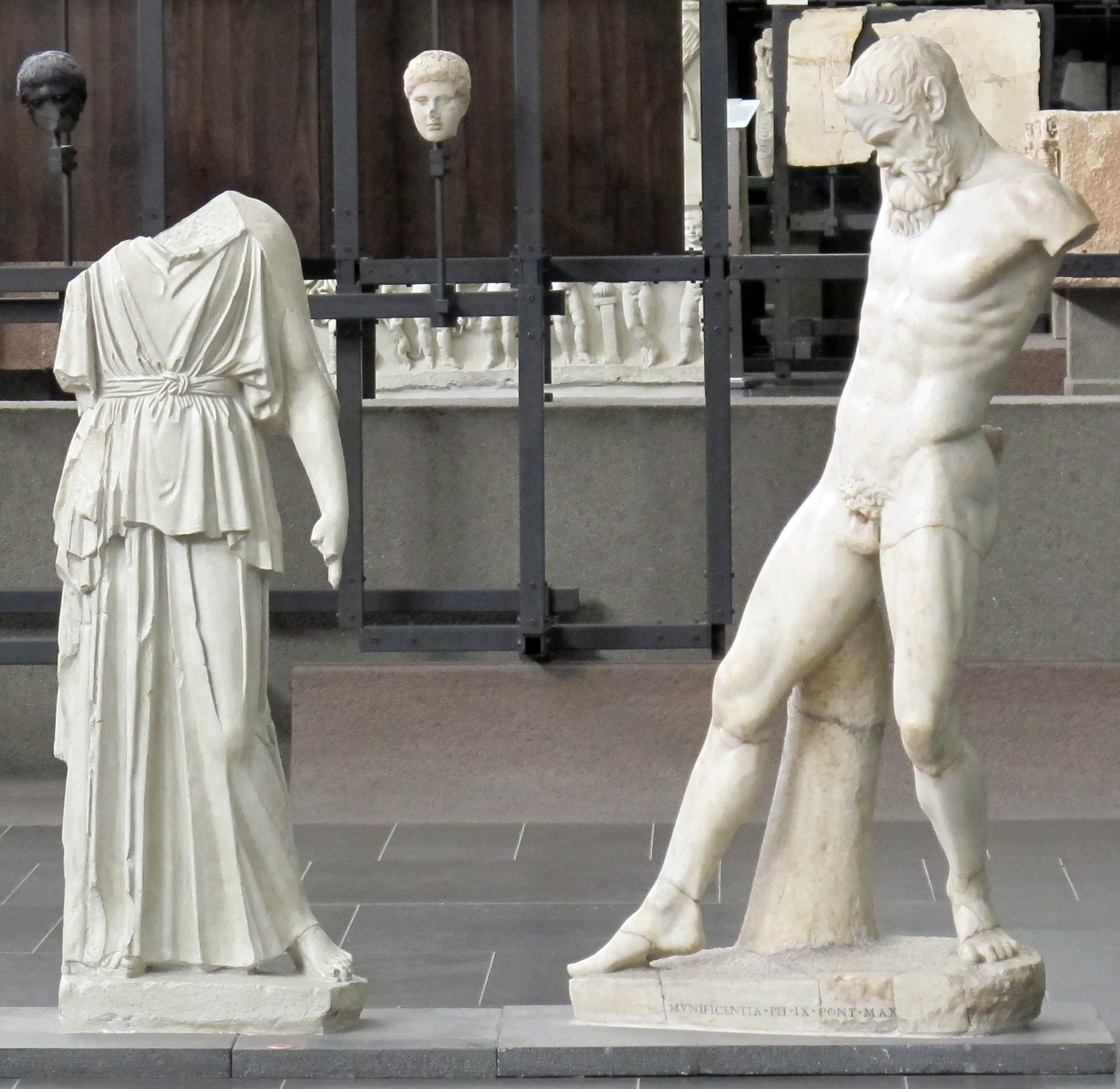
Athena-Marsyas Group, Rome, Museo Gregoriano Profano

The Athena Marsyas Group was a bronze sculptural group by Myron that stood on the Acropolis of Athens in the high classical period, dated to c 450 BCE. Now lost, it has been reconstructed from copies, coins, other visual sources and literary testimonia. The work depicted the satyr Marsyas picking up an aulos dropped by Athena.

== Literary testimonia ==
The sculpture is mentioned twice in the ancient sources. Pausanias writes: “In this place is a statue of Athena striking Marsyas the Silenus for taking up the flutes that the goddess wished to be cast away for good.” Pliny records: “His other works include Ladas and a ‘Discobolos’ or Man Throwing a Discus, and Perseus, and The Sawyers, and The Satyr Marvelling at the Flute and Athene”. In 1830, K. O. Müller first connected these bare notes in the literature with one another and two archaeological testimonies, an Attic coin from the imperial period and a late republican relief krater, the so-called "Finlay Krater", both of which depict Athena in a dramatic confrontation with Marsyas, and within which the depictions of the satyr show close similarity.

== Myth and auletics ==
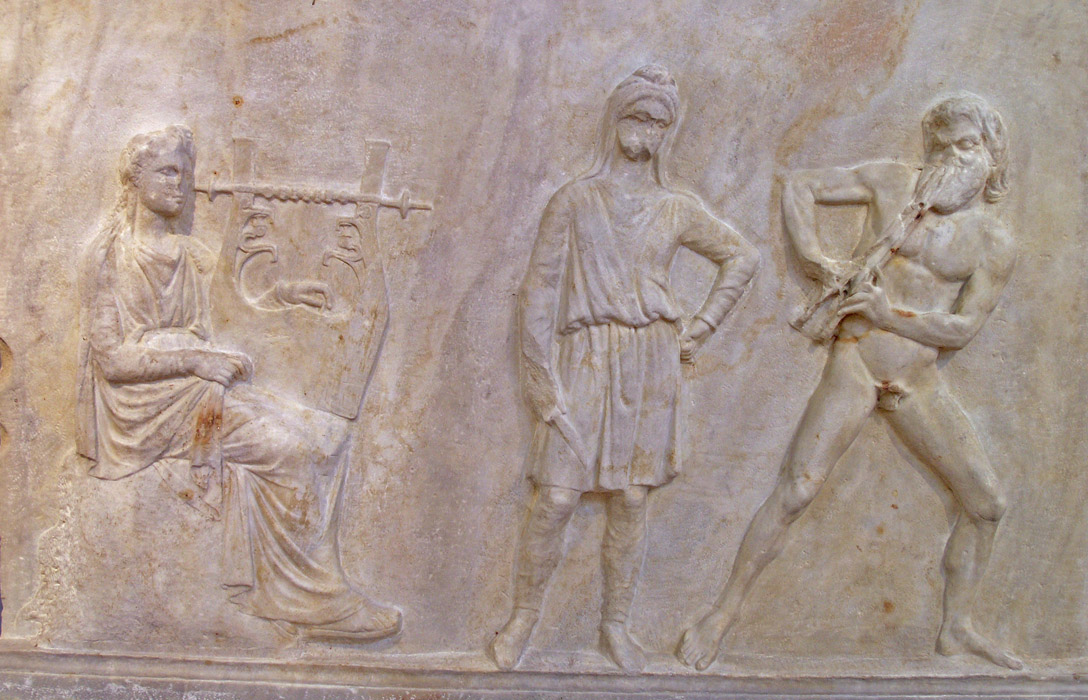
Competition between Apollo and Marsyas, around 330 BCE. from Mantineia, National Archaeological Museum, Athens MNA 216

In Greek mythology, Athena was thought to be the inventor of the aulos, with which, according to the poet Pindar, she imitated the funeral dirge of the Gorgons after the beheading of her mortal sister Medusa and gave it as a gift to humans for this purpose. Even Apollo was so taken with the instrument that, according to the Greek poet Korinna, he learned the aulos playing. Athena, however, who saw her reflection in a lake while playing, threw the new instrument away horrified at the disfiguration of her face. The discarded instrument was found by a satyr who soon mastered the art of playing to such an extent that he challenged Apollo to compete. As a result, the satyr was defeated in the competition – which was the subject of another sculpture group – and was flayed alive. According to Hyginus, Marsyas was the name of the satyr, and not only was the reflection in the water but also the laughter of Juno and Aphrodite the cause of Athena letting the aulos drop. Hyginus also writes that Athena cursed anyone who would play the instrument in the future.

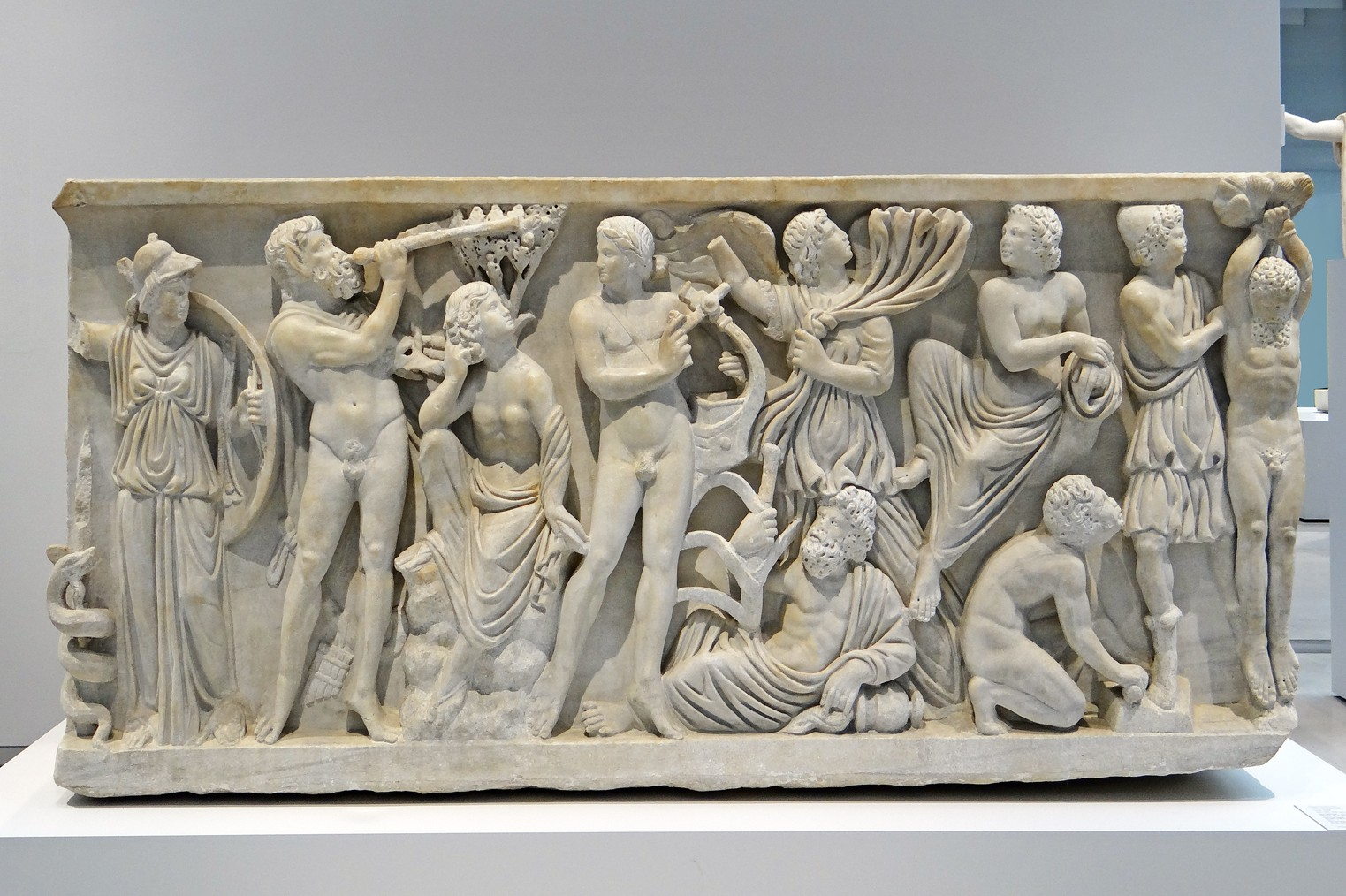
Competition between Apollo and Marsyas, on the right edge, the flaying; sarcophagus of the late 3rd century, Louvre-Lens

Since the late 18th. century the fundamental work on the subject has been "Pallas Musica and Apollo Marsyas-Töter" by Karl August Böttiger. It has been argued that the aulos fell out of fashion following the Persian Wars, which was accompanied by an anti-Boeotic attitude, since the sound of the instrument was too reminiscent of the shawms of the Persian army and the Boetians fighting by their side. The advocates of this theory invoked the anecdote handed down by Plutarch, that Alcibiades had refused to learn the instrument. However, this is contradicted by the speech of Alcibiades in Plato's Symposium, in which he compares the verbal power of Socrates with the musical effect of aulos and Socrates directly with Marsyas. Nevertheless, Plato rejected the "flute-makers and flute-players" as useless in the Republic. Aristotle followed him here and invoked directly the disdain of Athena, but thought the story of the distortion of her face as too superficial a reason for her reluctance and sought to intellectualized the interpretation: since one cannot blow and speak at the same time, the aulos is not conducive to spiritual development.

== Rediscovery ==
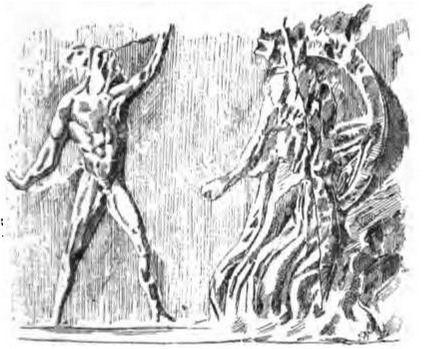
So-called Finlay Krater, Athens, National Archaeological Museum Athens

Like almost all bronze original works of Greek antiquity, the original of the Athena–Marsyas group of Myron is lost. Karl Otfried Müller, who was the first to relate the passages to the myth of Pliny and Pausanias, recognized representations of the Athena–Marsyas group in Athenian coins of the Roman Empire and in the relief of the "Finlay Krater" located in Athens. This prompted the Kopienkritik search amongst the stock of Roman copies for the original Greek models. In 1824, the antiquarian Ignazio Vescovali carried out excavations in Via dei Quadro Cantoni on the Esquiline Hill, in which, among many other finds, he discovered the statue of a satyr. A year later, the statue was acquired for the Pontifical Museum, but only exhibited in 1852 in the Museo Gregoriano Profano. As a result of an in-depth stylistic analysis, Heinrich Brunn recognized this statue as based on the Myronic Marsyas. Bruno Sauer proposed in 1907 to connect the Marsyas statue with a statue of Athena, which is present in various replicas in Paris, Toulouse and Madrid. A year later, at the suggestion of Adolf Furtwängler, Johannes Sieveking presented the first reconstruction of the group in plaster and a replica in copper. Ludwig Pollak published the Frankfurt Athena in 1909, the best-preserved replica of the Athena type, as a counterpart to the Marsyas of the Esquiline.

=== Other visual representations ===
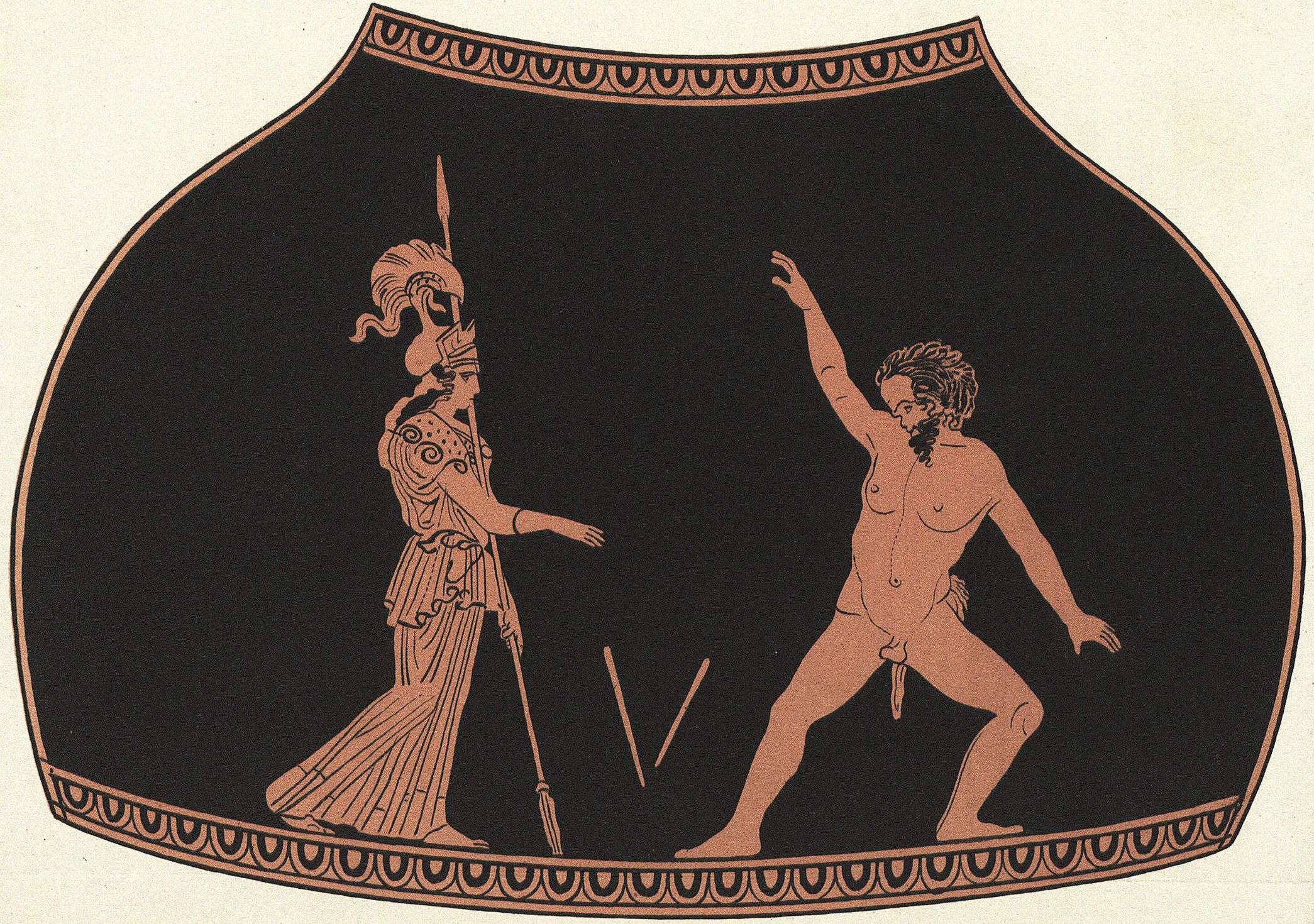
Red-figure oinochoe from Vari (Attica), Staatliche Museen zu Berlin

The oldest testimony of the group is the depiction on a red-figure oinochoe found at Vari, Attica. It was made around 440 BCE, and is located in the State Museums in Berlin. Athena is in strict right profile, holding a lance with her left hand, throwing away with the outstretched right hand the aulos, which can still be seen falling to the right of her. She wears a helmet and aegis and an ankle-length chiton. From the right, a satyr with a horse's tail, pointed animal ears and shaggy beard approaches the centre of the picture. His forward right leg sits roughly where the aulos will land, but he seems to be retreating with his right knee poised as if jumping. His right arm is raised high, his downward left arm balances the receding movement of his left leg.

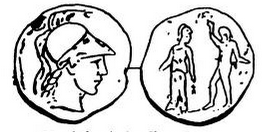
Drawing of a coin of the Hadrianic period

The same scene is also depicted on a Neo-Attic marble krater of around the middle of the 1st century BCE., which is located in the National Archaeological Museum of Athens, known as the "Finlay Crater". However, this not quite finished work is a mirror reflection of the oinochoe: Marsyas is on the left, Athena on the right. Accordingly, Marsyas raises his left arm. His movement floating between approach and retreat is also less dramatically accentuated. Athena, who is rushing into the right of the scene, which is clearly perceived by the movement of her robe, she holds a shield in her left hand, with the right she has just thrown down the aulos.

Coin portraits of the Roman imperial era also reflect the group, in two variants: a coin of the Hadrianic period shows the lanceless Athena on the left side of the picture; on another coin, from the time of Gordian, she is on the right. What both types have in common is the arm of the Marsyas, which is raised towards the centre of the picture.

== The replicas ==
Numerous copies of the group statues, some of which were only fragmentary, could be found in European collections of the nineteenth century. For example, there is one full statue replica of the Athena, seven body replicas and at least three head replicas. So far, a body replica, three torsos and three head replicas have been identified for the Marsyas. In addition, there are representations in vase painting, in relief sculpture and on coins. All this allows a fairly confident reconstruction of the group, even if individual details continue to be the subject of discussion. Nevertheless, there are mainly American researchers who in principle deny the pertinence of the reference of Pliny and Pausanias and do not want to recognize traces of the Athena–Marsyas group in either the coin representations or in the statuary traditions. It has also been proposed to divorce the statues discussed by Pliny and Pausanias into two groups: one by Myron, whose site was not known, and one on the Acropolis of Athens, which could not be assigned to a sculptor.

=== Athena statue ===
All replicas show the very youthful Athena standing upright, dressed in a high-belted peplos, whose right side is open. The weight weighs on the extended right leg, while the slightly angled left play leg stands out clearly below the robe. Her left foot only touches the ground with the ball and toes. With the Lancellotti and Paris replicas the robe does not reach as far as the ground, but clearly shows the feet. The Torso Lancellotti also has a hem on the edge of the robe, the apoptygma. The replicas in Florence and Hamburg mark Athena by means of an aegis that is missing from all other examples. The upper body performs a slight turn to her left, which the head with its pushed back helmet – in the original probably the only attribute of the statue as Athena – energetically absorbs, so that it almost appears in the profile. The view is directed at a target to be found on the ground and the left arm was also resting by her side, clearly indicating downwards. With the right, which is preserved in the Frankfurt Athena as well as part of the associated arm, the goddess held a lance. Her hair is folded over the forehead and neck and pushed under the helmet – a Chalcidian helmet, as can be seen from the recess for the ears. However, with the replicas in Toulouse and Florence, a dense braid falls over the neck and shoulders.

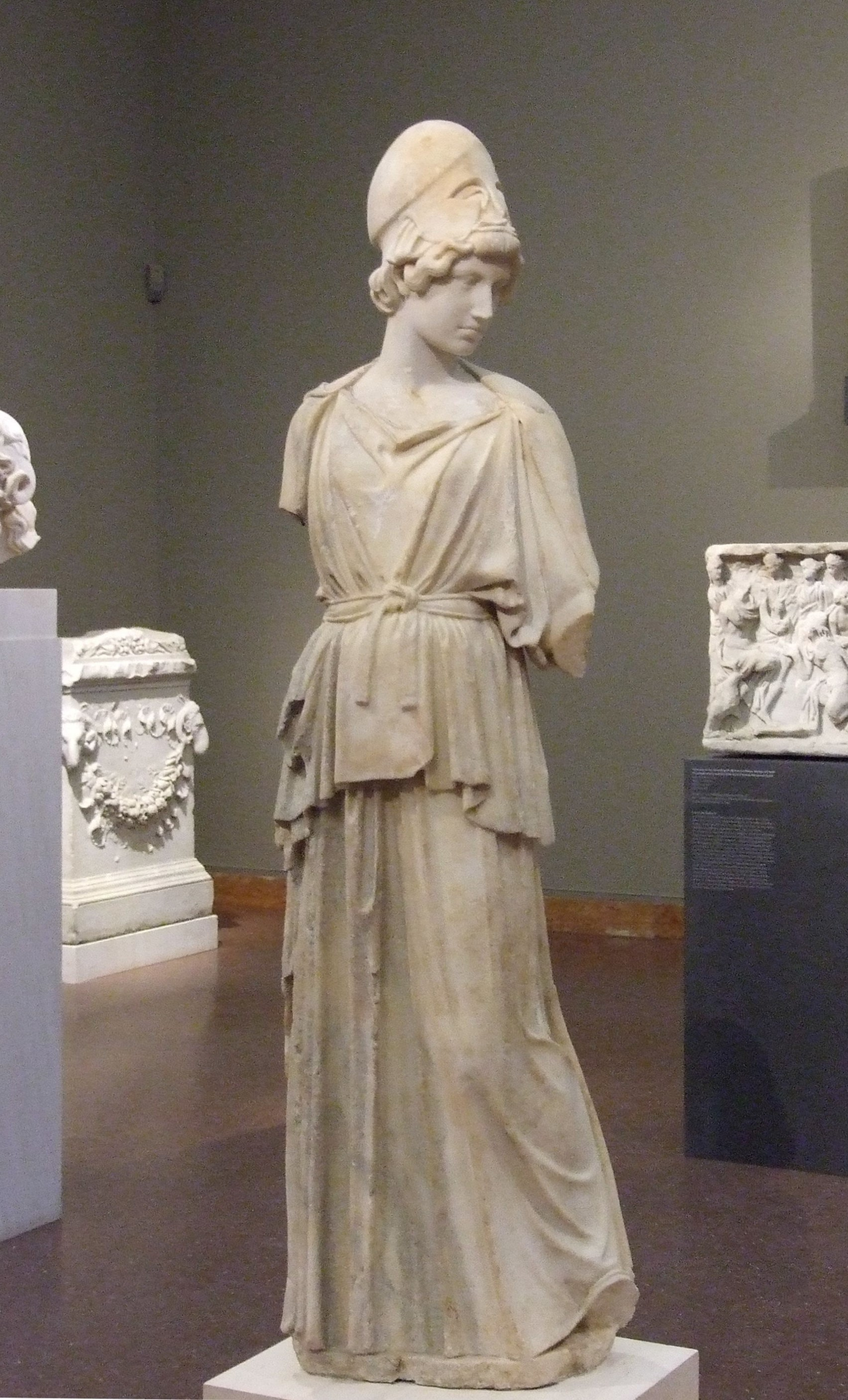
Frankfurter Athena, Liebieghaus

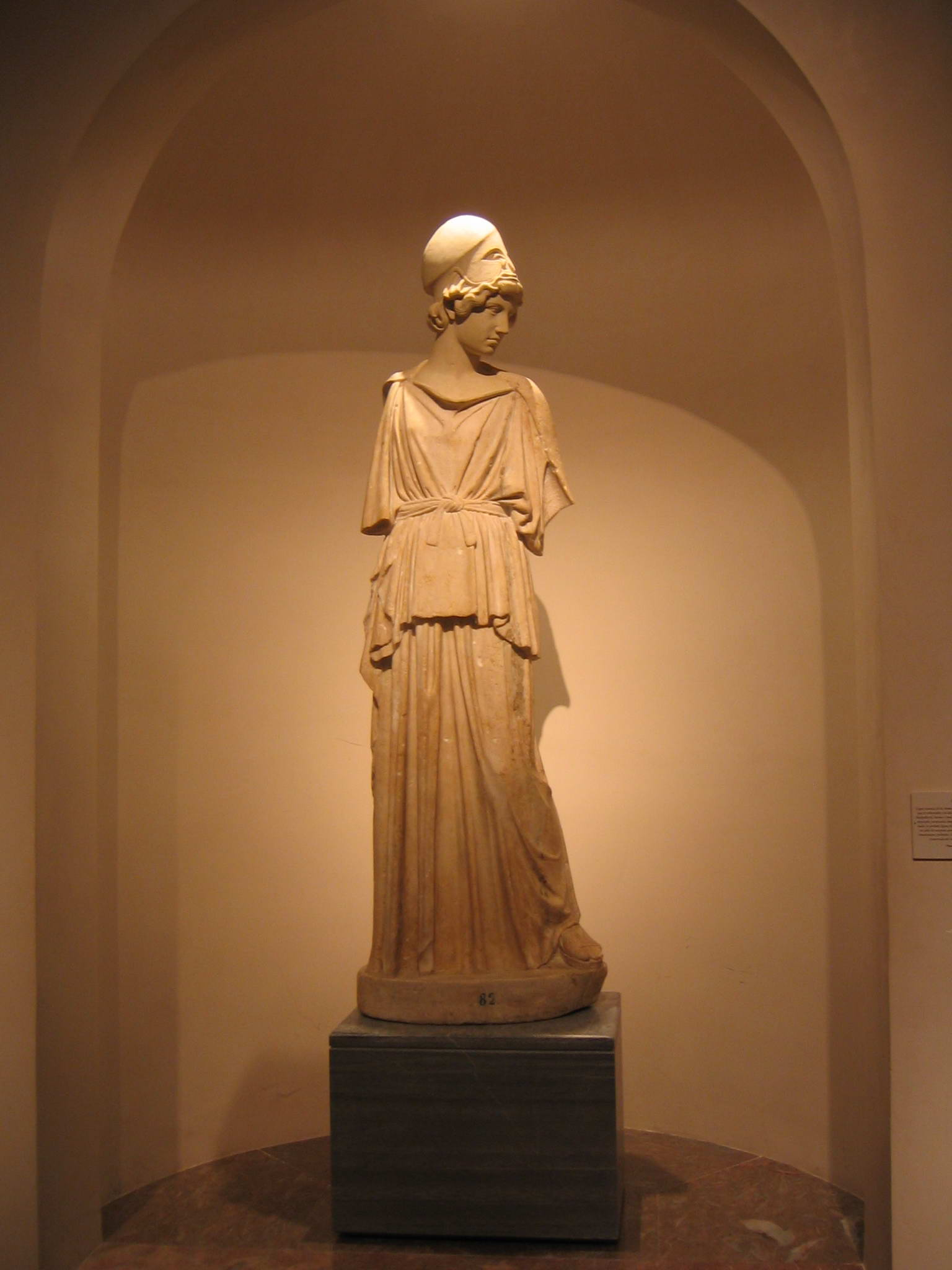
Athena, Madrid, Museo del Prado 82-E

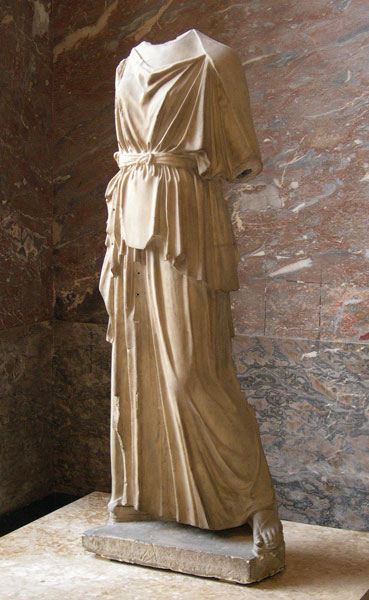
Athena, Paris, Louvre MA 2208

Replicas of Athena

Type	Museum	Find Location	Description
Statue	Frankfurt am Main, Liebieghaus Inv. 195	Rome, Via Gregoriana 32	Height without plinth: 1.67 m. Frankfurt Athena. Discovered in Rome in 1884, acquired by Frankfurt citizens in 1908 and donated to the Liebieghaus in 1909 for the opening of the museum. Body made of pentelic marble, head made of parian marble.
Torso	Florence, Giardino di Boboli	unknown	Height: 1.47 m. The head and bust cutout are added.
Torso	Hamburg, Museum für Kunst und Gewerbe	allegedly Villa Hadriana, Tivoli	Height without plinth: 1.35 m. Right arm and left forearm are missing.
Torso	Madrid, Museo del Prado Inv. E-82	unknown	Height without plinth: 1.39 m. Both arms are missing, head was worked separately and missing.
Torso	Paris, Louvre Inv. MA 2008	unknown	Height without plinth: 1.38 m. Right shoulder and right back are missing until the strap. Pentelic marble.
Torso	Reggio Calabria, Museo Civico Inv. 6493 C	unknown	Greatly reduced in size with a maximum height of 0.62 m.
Torso	Rome, Villa Massimo	Rome, from the Villa Peretti on the Esquiline	Height without plinth: 1.37 m. Athena Lancellotti. Missing head was worked separately. Right arm missing, left arm cut in the area of the elbow and in the forearm, probably a repair.
Torso	Toulouse, Museum Inv. 30339	Martres-Tolosane	Height without plinth: 1.40 m. found in 1890, both arms are missing. Shock of hair head at the nape of the neck.
Head	Athens, Acropolis Museum Inv. 2353	Athens	Height: 0.21 m. Only the neck and left lower half of the face are preserved.
Head	Dresden, Staatliche Skulpturensammlung	Allegedly from Apulia	Height: 0.33 m. In Dresden since 1899, made of pentelic marble.
Head	Rome, Vatican Museum	unknown	Height: 0.17 m. Head fragment, broken above the forehead.
Head	Rome, Antiquarium Forense Inv. 12603	Rome, Basilica Aemilia from the Forum Romanum	Height: 0.25 m. Head fragment made of pentelic marble, assignment likely, but not secured.

=== Marsyas statue ===
The best-preserved replica of Marsyas, which is in the Vatican Museums and was found on the Esquiline in Rome, reflects the movement motif of the satyr most conscientiously. Marsyas stands on the ball of the foot, the heels are raised. His right leg is extended forward, almost right-angled to this is the left foot directed at the viewer, the slightly bent left leg carries the entire load shifted backwards to the left. Only the lower leg of the statue of the Esquiline is a modern addition, but the foot position is certain. Dancing, advancing or recoiling, Marsyas approaches an object lying on the ground, to which his gaze is directed. The muscles of the body are strong and toned, which are worked out in such detail and anatomically correct that even fine veins are displayed on the surface. The presented right foot is also followed by the right arm stretched upwards and slightly forward, while the left arm is held away from the upper body and downwards. This is answered by the flatter breast muscles of the stretched right side. The whole body is captured at the moment of an incipient turn that makes an escape from its urge to move forward. Thrown into deep wrinkles is the forehead of Marsyas, which clearly shows himself as a satyr by his pointed ears, his tail and his thick, round nose. Amazement, curiosity and fascination with the object of his gaze are expressed in his facial expressions.

The largely preserved statue in the Vatican Museums has a notable feature: it has two depressions on the statue base, one in front of the left, conjectured foot, the other about 23 centimetres further to the left centre. They were used to fasten one or more objects now lost, which were probably made of metal.

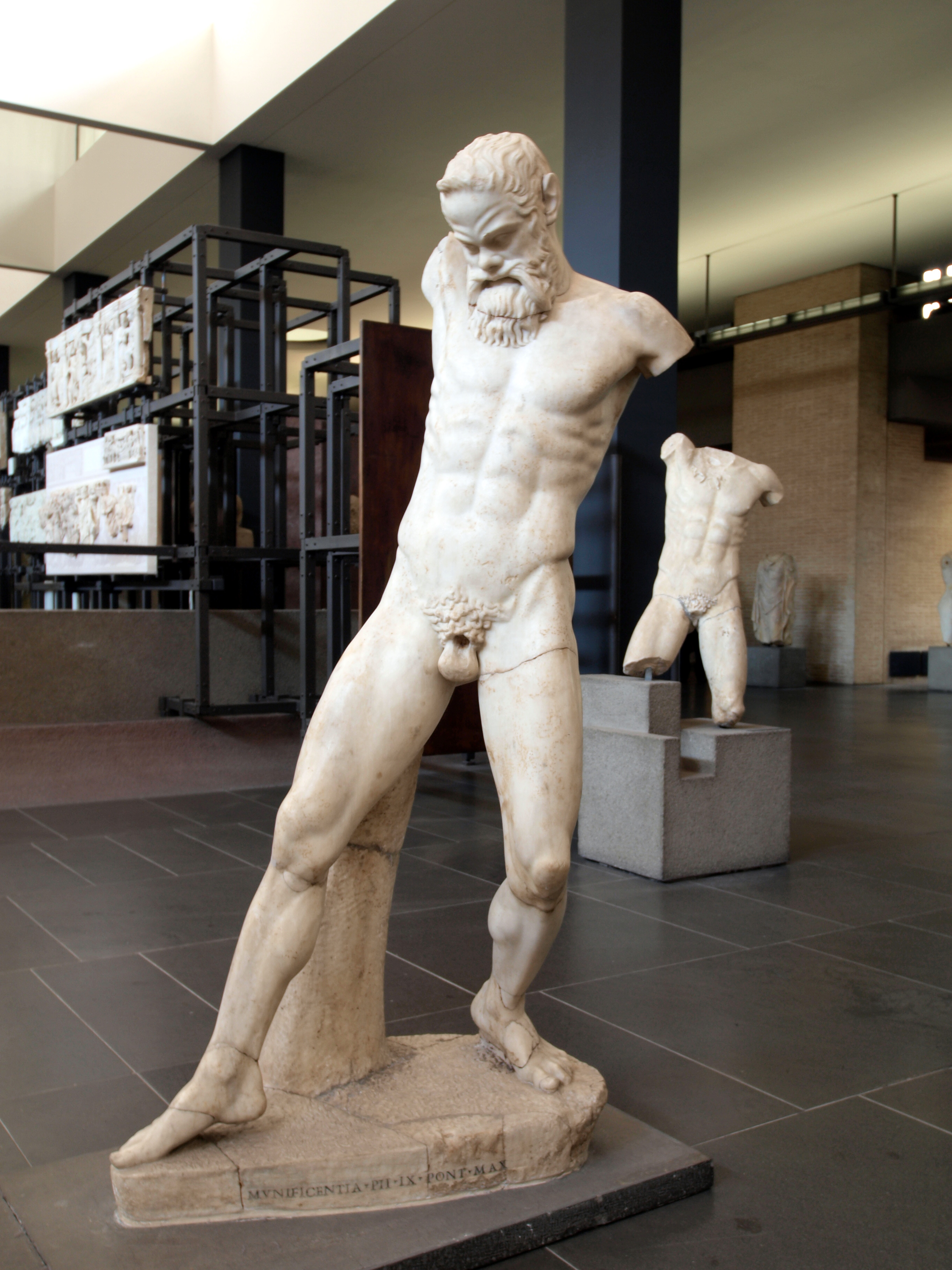
Esquiline Marsyas, Rome, Museo Gregoriano Profano

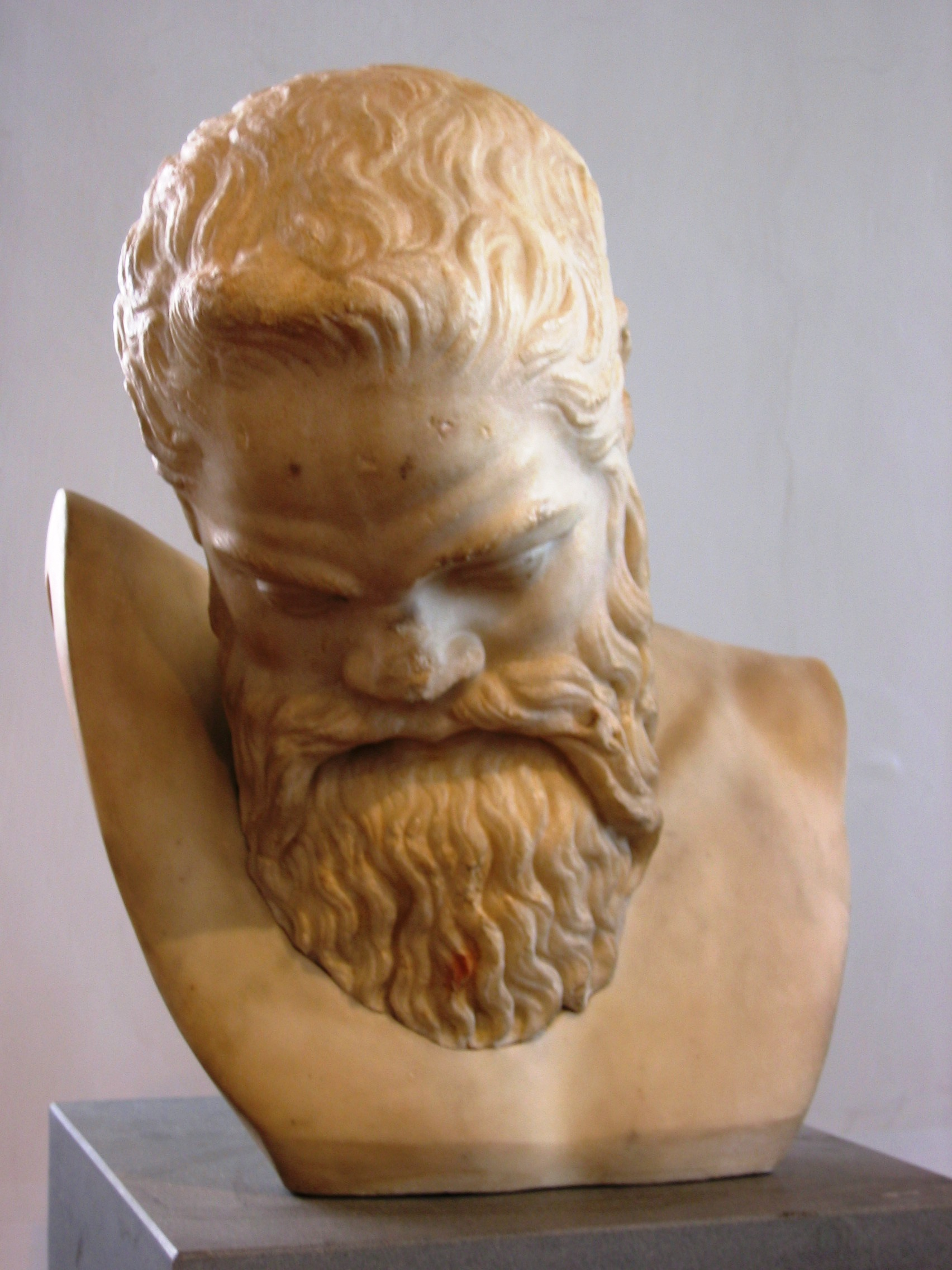
Marsyas, Rome, Museo Barracco

Replica of Marsyas

Type	Museum	Find Location	Description
Statue	Rome, Vatican Museum Inv. 9974	Rome, Via dei Quadro Cantoni 46–48	Altitude without plinth: 1.56 m. discovered in 1824 in Via dei Quadro Cantoni on the Esquiline. Head broken and discovered a few days later, once incorrectly ascribed arms removed again in 1925. Ears modernly complemented. Two ancient depressions on the plinth.
Torso	Rome, Vatican Museum Inv. 9975	Castel Gandolfo	Height: 1.12 m. found in 1932 in the area of the Papal Villa. Head, arms and lower legs are missing. Both thighs broken.
Torso	Malibu, J. Paul Getty Museum Inv. 71AA122	unknown	Height: 0.72 m. Acquired from the art trade in 1971. Head, arms and legs are missing.
Head	Rome, Museo Barracco	Acquired in Rome	Height 0.28 m. Only the head made of antique Pentelic marble and set in a modern bust.
Head	Rome, Capitoline Museums, Antiquarium Inv. 15724	Rom, Via Appia	Height: 0.17 m. Discovered during excavations in the Circus of Maxentius on Via Appia in 1960.
Head	Rome, Capitoline Museums, Magazine Inv. 2697	unknown	Height: 0.17 m. Only the upper part of the head from the skull to the upper lip survives.

== Reconstruction ==
At no time have both figures been discovered in the same find. And although both types of statues do not give a direct indication that they had a counterpart, the structure and movement show that they are not self-contained and stand-alone compositions. The comparison with the representations in vase painting, relief and coins, on the other hand, makes it clear that these two statues are connected by isocephaly and form a coherent scene once grouped together.

Since the first reconstructions of the group of Bruno Sauer in 1907 and those of Johannes Sieveking and Adolf Furtwängler in 1908, many proposals for the composition have been made, most of which focused on the reconstruction of the arm postures, especially that of Athena. Paul Jonas Meier believed that he had recognized the remains of a small protrusion, a "puntello", on the right side of the apoptygma of Athena and reconstructed the position of the right arm in front of the body, holding a lance diagonally upwards to the compositional centre of the group. He also turned the Marsyas more into profile. With this disposition of the lance, Meier seemed to have come close for the first time to Pausanias' statement that Athena had struck the satyr.

However, an examination of the statue and especially the puntello, which was interpreted as a bridge attachment, made by Heinrich Bulle caused him to realize that the basis for Meier's reconstruction is unjustifiable, since the supposed puntello is only a sintering and cannot offer sustainable support. He repudiated his own reconstruction proposal a few years later.

Sieveking tried to take a new path in 1912. He completely detached himself from the reconstruction developed in 1908 with Furtwängler and now gave Athena the two auloi in the left and right hand. On the one hand, there is the lack of expected holes in the object, which is sufficiently preserved in the hands of the Frankfurt Athena and which can only be the piece of a lance shaft, on the other hand, the reconstruction does not take into account the holes based on the Marsyas of the Esquiline. But the reconstruction of an aulos in the right hand of Athena also found the approval of Peter Cornelis Bol and others.

Regardless of further details, the question of the object in the right hand of Athena has so far been unresolved, while at least one aulos was probably at the feet of Marsyas. Raimund Wünsche argued that Athena with the lance in her right hand was directed against Marsyas, while the open left pointed to the aulos lying on the ground.

Most recently, Vinzenz Brinkmann documented the technical findings of the Frankfurt Athena replica following Heinrich Bulle. His observations favour the early reconstruction of Bulle, according to which the lance of Athena starts obliquely behind the body of Athena to point far to its left.

Reconstruction of the Athena-Marsyas-Group

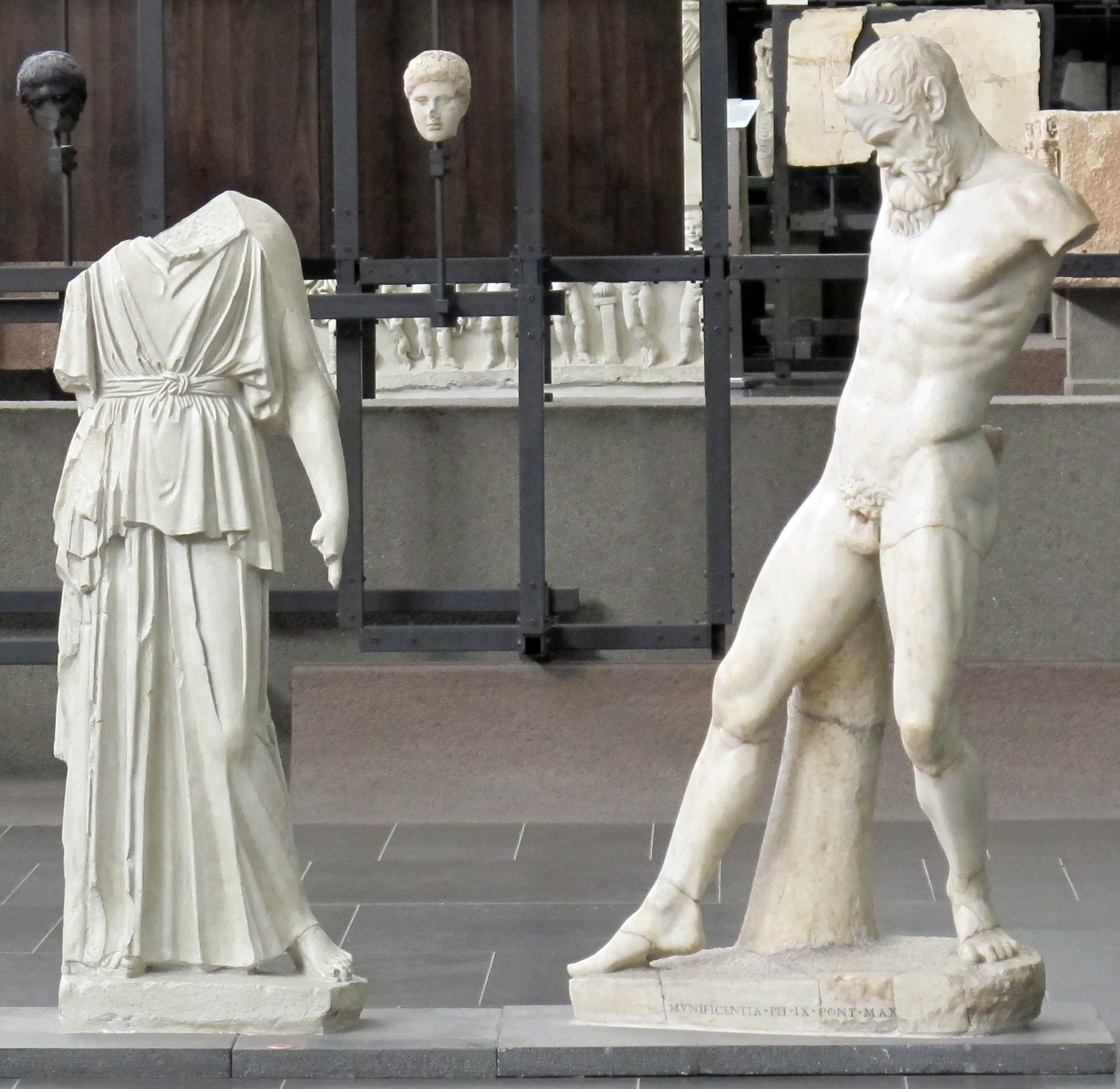
Rome, Museo Gregoriano Profano

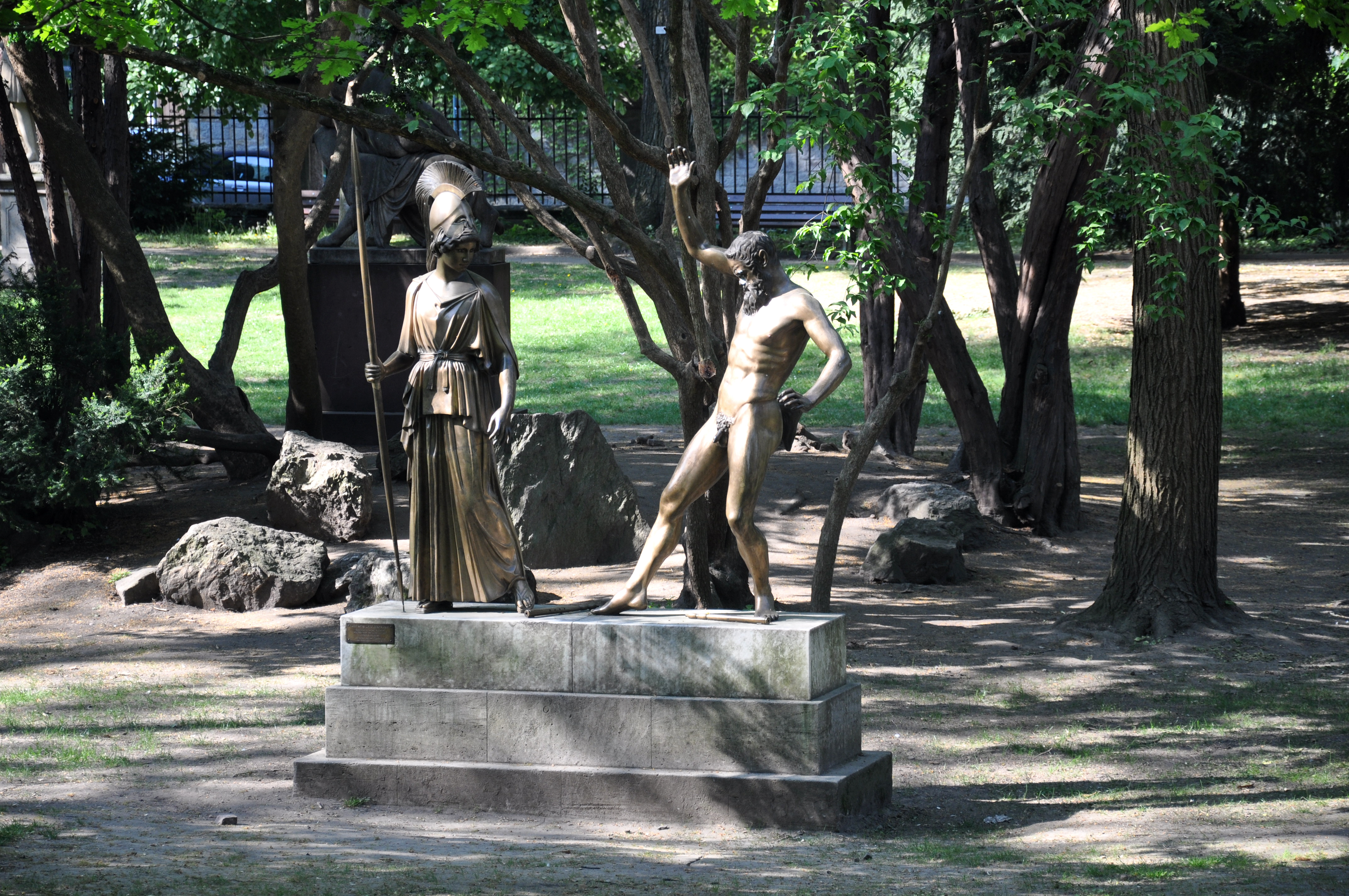
Frankfurt am Main, Liebieghaus

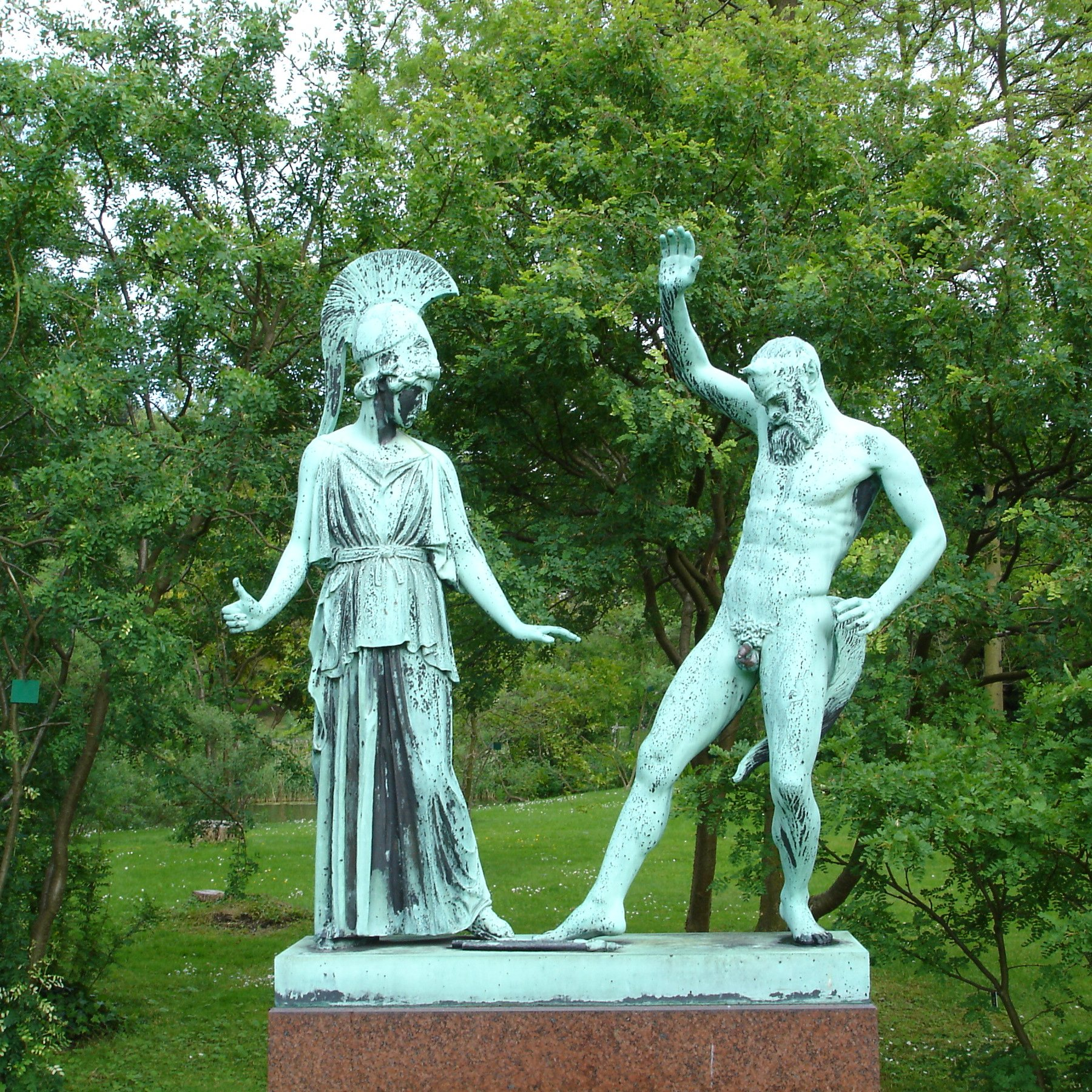
Copenhagen, Botanischer Garten

== Interpretation ==
There is no information about who commissioned the statue or the occasion of its dedication, but attempts have been repeatedly made to try to put the work in its historical context. John Boardman connected the group with the poet Melanippides, who was considered the innovator of the dithyramb, and who sometime in the middle of the 5th century BCE wrote a dithyramb on Marsyas. Boardman thus repudiated those 18th. century scholars who saw the monument as assertion of Athenian superiority over Boeotia. Marsyas represents the wild and aulos loving Boeotia in this reading, and Athena as city goddess of civilized Athens favouring the lyre. An antagonism that also found violent expression. Myron was even seen in this context as a particularly pointed, humorous and satirical artist. Werner Gauer saw the group of statues specifically as an anathema directed against the Persians and to be connected with the Peace of Callias of 449.

Another approach is pursued by interpretations that focus on the invention of the aulos and emphasise Athena's aspect as a culture hero. But the connection with Marsyas would find its justification in the fact that the satyr served as a mediator of this art to the people, because according to Johannes Tzetzes, a Byzantine scholar of the 12th century. century, who still had extensive antique writings available, Athena handed over the art of the auletics to Marsyas. A conflict between Athena and Marsyas was therefore not expressed at all in the group, the presentation of such was never intended, but only as a result of the incomprehension of later times.

So far, satisfactory interpretations of the group and the reason for its establishment, supported by a broader scholarly consensus, which is even attributed to the "special conceptual quality" of the work: Since it can be read and understood in many ways, the circle of possible donors is also correspondingly large.

== Bibliography ==
- Ellen Van Keer, The Myth of Marsyas in Ancient Greek Art: Musical and Mythological Iconography, Music in Art XXIX/1–2 (2004)
- H. Anne Weis, The "Marsyas" of Myron: Old Problems and New Evidence, American Journal of Archaeology, Vol. 83, No. 2, 1979, pp. 214–219.
- Klaus Junker, Interpreting the Images of Greek Myths: An Introduction, Cambridge, 2012
- Klaus Junker, Die Athena-Marsyas-Gruppe des Myron, JdI, 117, 2002.
- Georg Daltrop, Peter Cornelis Bol: Athena des Myron in Liebieghaus Monographie. Band 8. Liebieghaus, Frankfurt am Main 1983
- Werner Gauer: Athena und Marsyas. In: Detlef Rößler, Veit Stürmer (eds.): Modus in rebus. Gedenkschrift für W. Schindler. Mann, Berlin 1995
- Peter Cornelis Bol: Liebieghaus – Museum alter Plastik, Frankfurt am Main. Führer durch die Sammlungen. Griechische und römische Plastik. Liebieghaus, Frankfurt am Main 1997
- Helga Bumke: Statuarische Gruppen in der frühen griechischen Kunst in Jahrbuch des Deutschen Archäologischen Instituts.Ergänzungs-Heft 32. De Gruyter, Berlin/New York 2004
- Vinzenz Brinkmann: Die Athena-Marsyas-Gruppe des Myron. In: Vinzenz Brinkmann (ed): Die Launen des Olymp. Der Mythos von Athena, Marsyas und Apoll. Liebieghaus, Frankfurt am Main 2008
- Luise Seemann: Zur Interpretation der Athena-Marsyas-Gruppe des Myron. In: Boreas. Münstersche Beiträge zur Archäologie. Band 32, 2009
- Klaus Junker: Götter als Erfinder. Die Entstehung der Kultur in der griechischen Kunst. Philipp von Zabern, Darmstadt/Mainz 2012.
