= Temple of Zeus, Olympia =

Ancient Greek temple

Coordinates: 37°38′16″N 21°37′48″E

Temple of Zeus
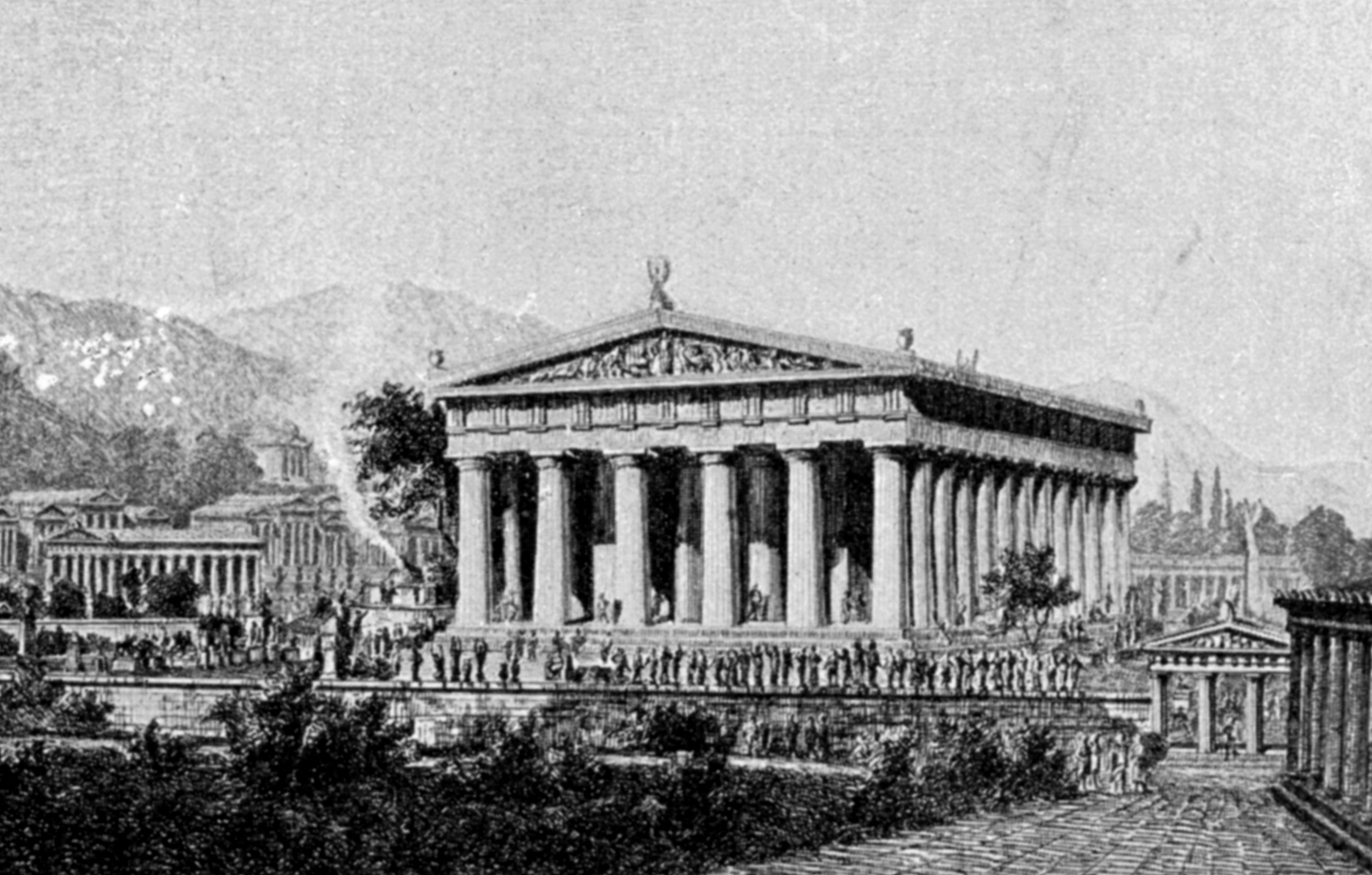
- Wilhelm Lübke's illustration of the temple as it might have looked in the fifth century BC

General information
- Type: Greek temple
- Architectural style: Ancient Greek architecture
- Location: Olympia, Greece
- Construction started: c. 472 BC
- Completed: 456 BC
- Destroyed: AD 426 (sanctuary), AD 522, AD 551

Height
- Height: 68 feet (20.7 m)

Technical details
- Size: 236 by 98 ft (72 by 30 m)

Design and construction
- Architect: Libon
- Other designers: Paeonius, Alcamenes

The Temple of Zeus was an ancient Greek temple in Olympia, Greece, dedicated to the god Zeus. The temple, built in the second quarter of the fifth century BC, was the very model of the fully developed classical Greek temple of the Doric order.

== Construction ==
The Temple of Zeus was built on an already ancient religious site at Olympia. The Altis, an enclosure with a sacred grove, open-air altars and the tumulus of Pelops, was first formed during the tenth and ninth centuries BC. The temple was constructed between c. 472 and 456 BC.

Floor plan

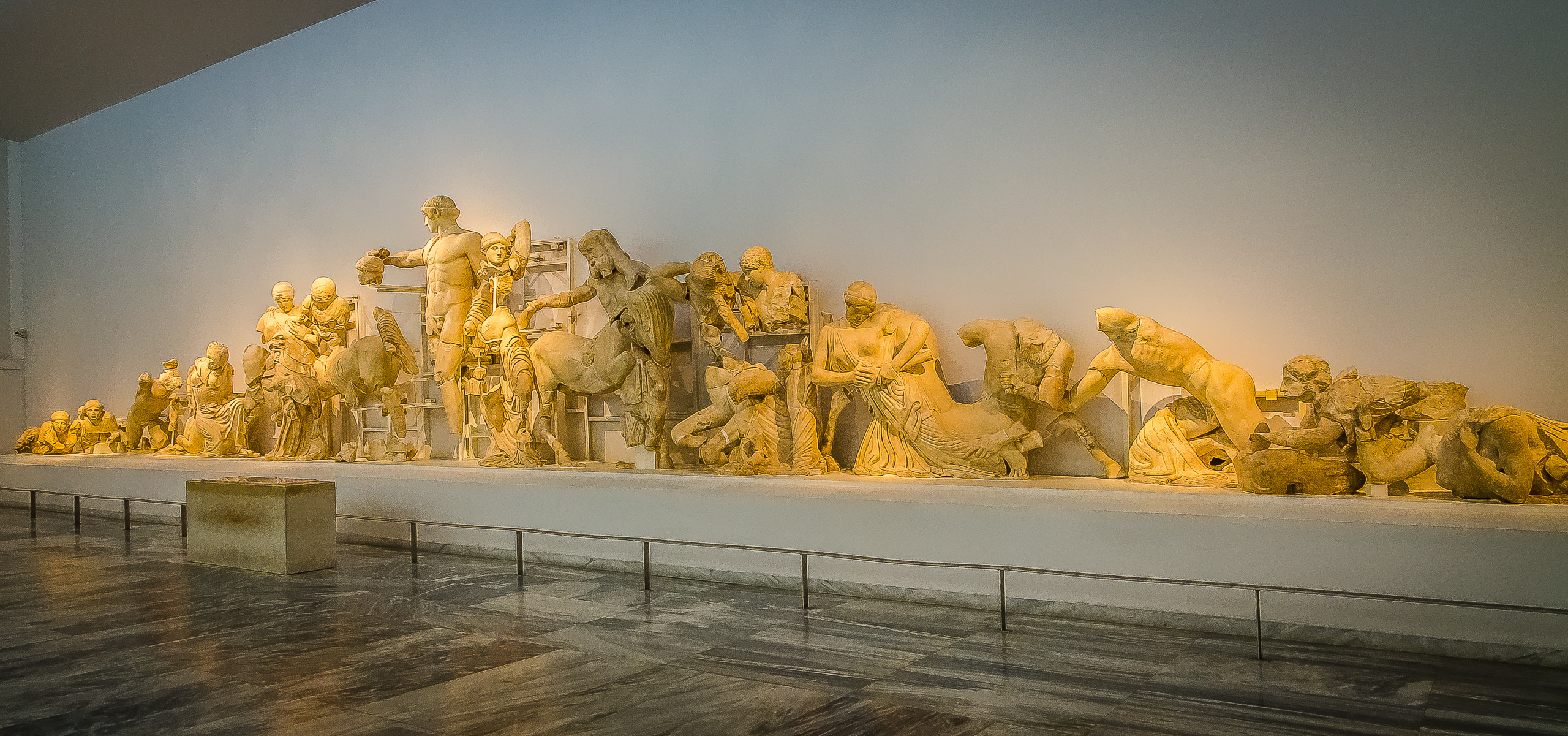
Pedimental sculptures in the Archaeological Museum of Olympia

The temple was of peripteral form with a frontal pronaos (porch), mirrored by a similar arrangement at the back of the building, the opisthodomos. The building sat on a crepidoma (platform) of three unequal steps, the exterior columns were positioned in a six by thirteen arrangement, two rows of seven columns divided the cella (inner chamber) into three aisles. An echo of the temple's original appearance can be seen in the Second Temple of Hera at Paestum, which closely followed its form.

Pausanias visited the site in the second century AD and states that the temple's height up to the pediment was 68 feet (20.7 m), its breadth was 95 feet (29.0 m), and its length 230 feet (70.1 m). It was approached by a ramp on the east side.

Because the main structure was of a local poros stone that was unattractive and of poor quality, it was coated with a thin layer of stucco to give the appearance of marble so as to match the sculptural decoration. It was roofed with tiles of Pentelic marble, cut thin enough to be translucent, so that on a summer's day, "light comparable to a conventional 20-watt bulb would have shone through each of the 1,000 tiles."

From the edge of the roof projected 102 waterspouts or gargoyles in the shape of lion heads, of which 39 are extant. Incongruities in the styles of the spouts provide evidence that the roof was repaired during the Roman period.

== Sculpture and decorations ==
A 7 metre high, cone shaped altar of ash collected during almost daily sacrifice is situated outside the temple facing the East. It formed the heart of the sanctuary and made up one of almost 60 altars.

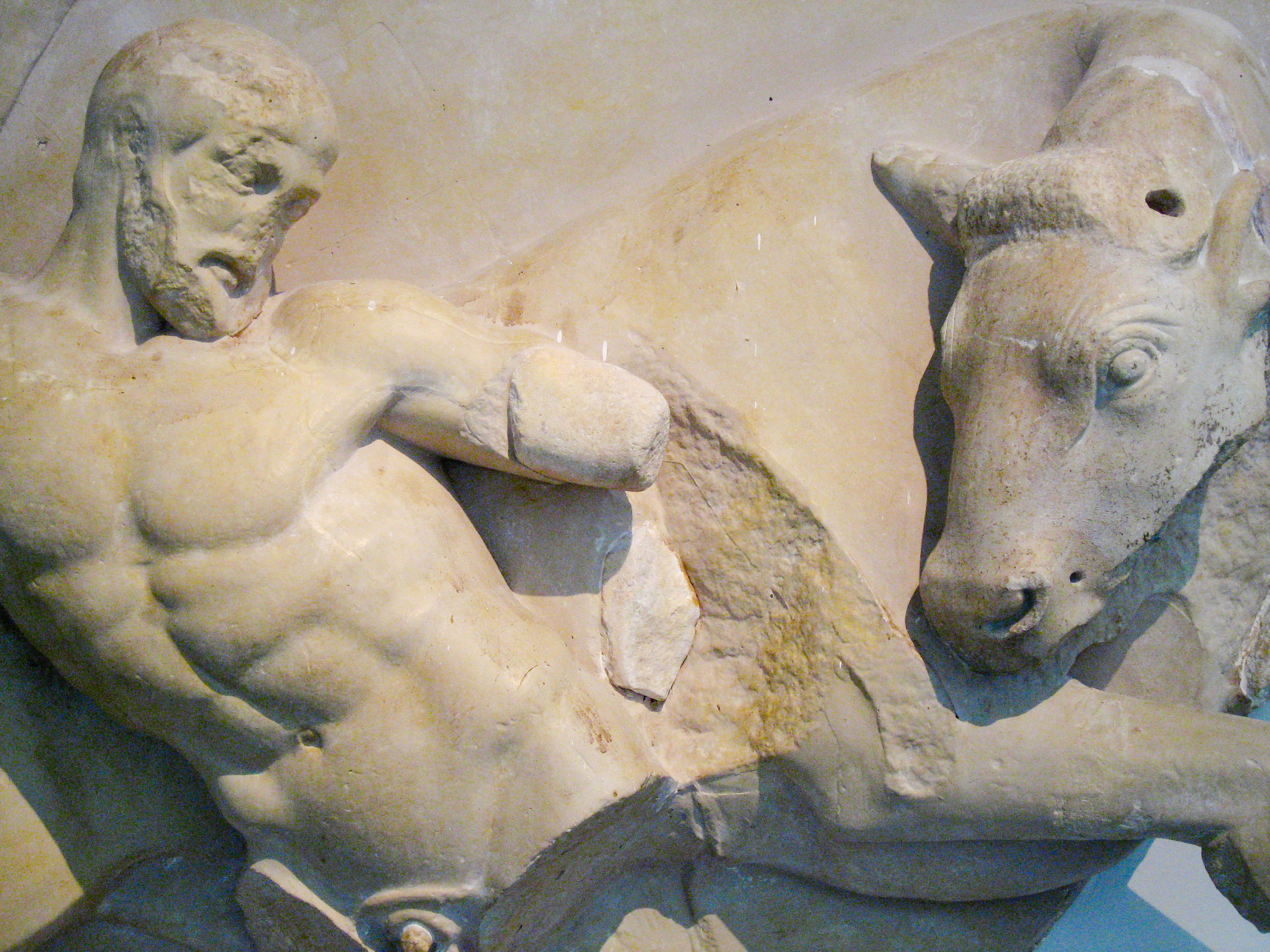
Detail of a metope from the Temple of Zeus at Olympia, featuring Heracles and the Cretan bull (Archaeological Museum of Olympia, Greece)

The sculptural decoration in imported Parian marble featured carved metopes and triglyph friezes, topped by pediments filled with sculptures in the Severe style, now attributed to the "Olympia Master" and his studio.

The Eastern pediment depicts the chariot race between Pelops and Oenomaus, while the Western pediment features a Centauromachy with Theseus and the Lapiths. The god Apollo is featured on the western pediment pointing towards the human side in the Centauromachy, indicating his favor, and towards the northern side of the temple. Pausanias reports in his Description of Greece (5.10.8) that the Eastern pedimental sculpture was created by Paeonius and the Western sculpture was carved by Alcamenes. The metopes from the temple depict the twelve labours of Heracles., who was said to have founded the Olympics at the temple.

== Statue of Zeus ==
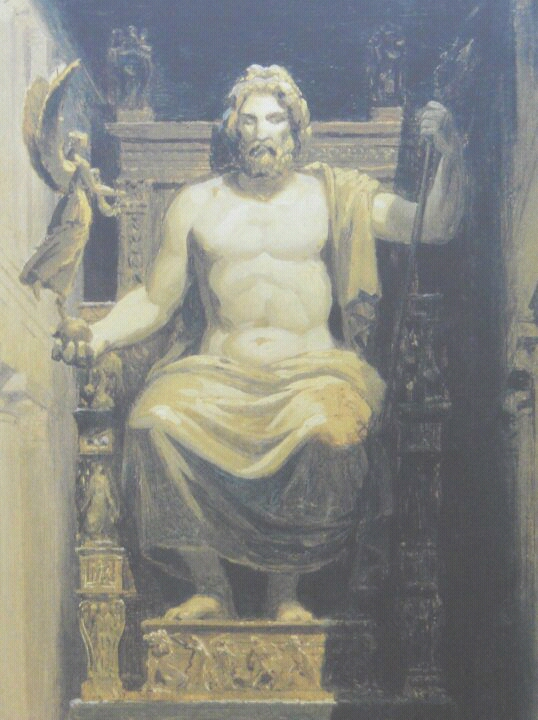
Artist's reconstruction of the Statue of Zeus at Olympia

The temple housed the renowned Statue of Zeus, which was one of the Seven Wonders of the Ancient World. The chryselephantine (gold and ivory) statue was approximately 13 m (43 ft) high, and was made by the sculptor Phidias in his workshop on the site at Olympia. The statue's completion took approximately 13 years (470–457 BC) and was one of Classical Greece's most revered artistic works.

The installation of the colossal statue coincided with substantial modification of the cella. The internal columns and their stylobates were dismantled and repositioned, which likely necessitated retiling the roof. The original floor, paved with large blocks of shell stone, was covered with water-resistant lime, which may have helped protect the statue's ivory against humidity.

== Subsequent history ==
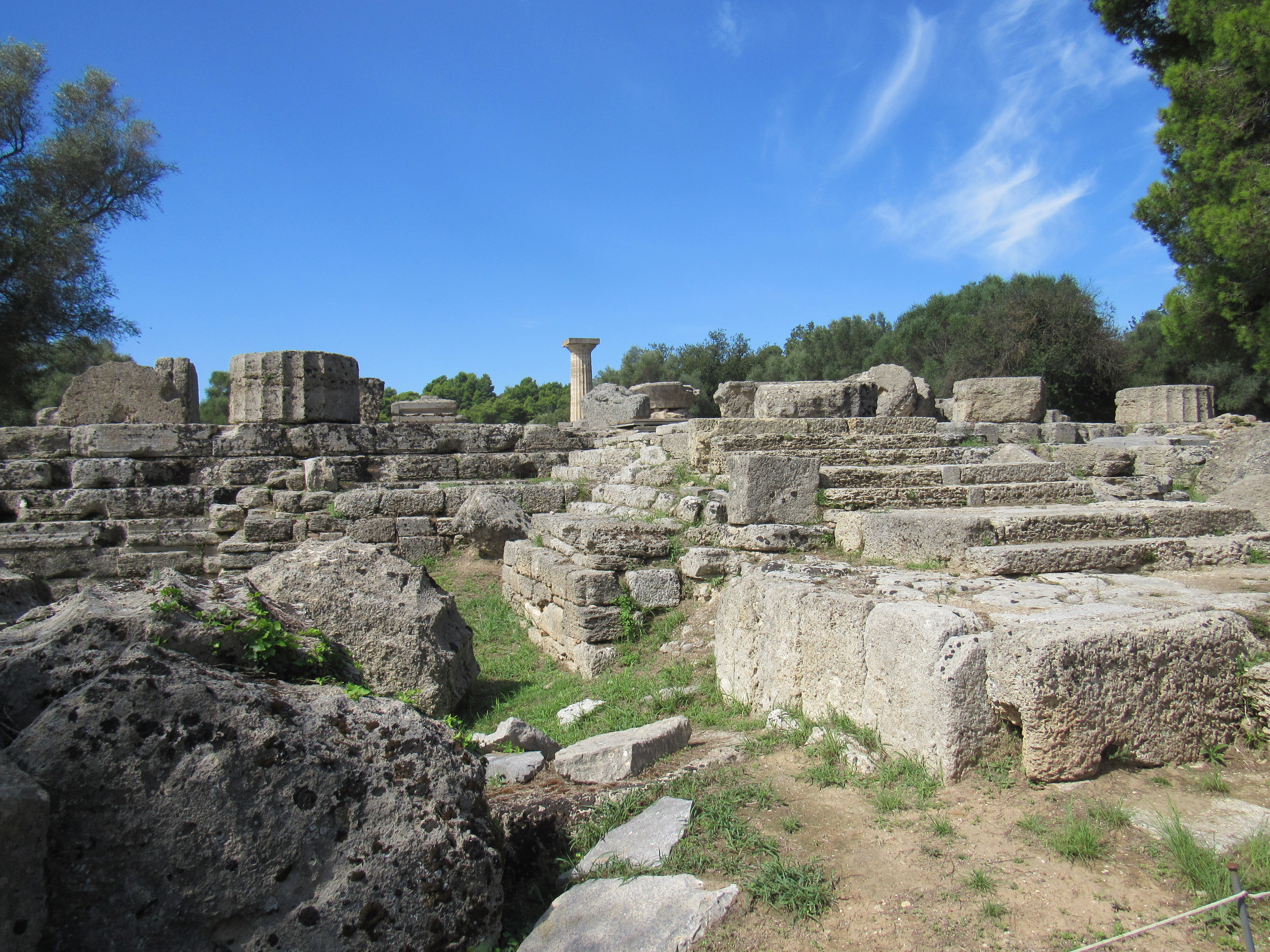
The Temple of Zeus in 2016

The Roman general Mummius dedicated twenty-one gilded shields after he sacked Corinth in 146 BC; they were fixed at the metopes of the eastern front side and the eastern half of the south side.

Archaeologists have long postulated that the Temple was destroyed by the earthquakes of AD 522 and 551, known to have caused widespread damage in the Peloponnese, although a 2014 paper hypothesizes that the columns may have been "intentionally pulled down by ropes during the early Byzantine period". Flooding of the Kladeos river (Foundoulis et al., 2008), or by tsunami (Vott et al., 2011), led to abandonment of the area in the 6th century. Eventually the site was covered by alluvial deposits of up to 8 meters deep.

The site of the ancient sanctuary of Olympia, long forgotten under landslips and flood siltation, was identified in 1766 by the English antiquarian Richard Chandler. In May 1829, the French team of archaeologists of the "Scientific Expedition of Morea" (under the direction of Léon-Jean-Joseph Dubois and Abel Blouet) identified with certainty and partially excavated the Temple of Zeus for the first time, taking several fragments of the metopes to the Musée du Louvre (with the authorization of the Governor of Greece, Ioannis Kapodistrias). Systematic excavation began in 1875, under the direction of the German Archaeological Institute, and has continued, with some interruptions, to the present time.

== See also ==
- List of Ancient Greek temples
- List of Greco-Roman roofs

== Sources ==
- Frazer, J.G. (1913). Pausanias's Description of Greece. Macmillan and Company, limited.
