= Farnese Hercules =

Roman marble statue made circa 216

Coordinates: 40.8534°N 14.2505°E

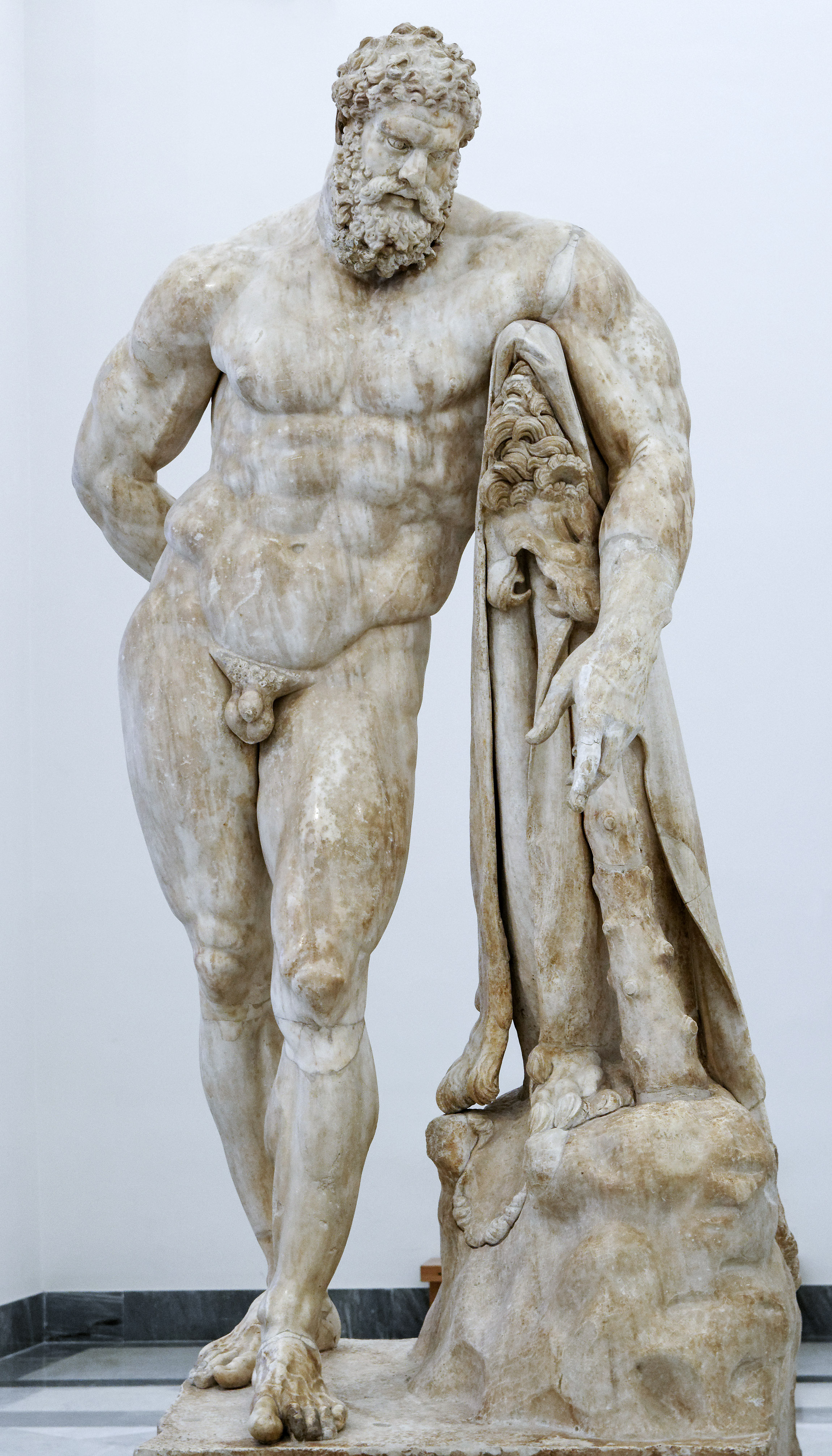
- Artist: Glykon, reproduced from the original by Lysippos
- Year: c. 216 AD (4th century BC for original)
- Type: Statue
- Medium: Marble
- Subject: Hercules
- Dimensions: 3.17 m (10.5 ft)
- Location: Museo Archeologico Nazionale, Naples

The Farnese Hercules (Italian: Ercole Farnese) is an ancient statue of Hercules made in the early third century AD and signed by Glykon, who is otherwise unknown; he was an Athenian but he may have worked in Rome. Like many other Ancient Roman sculptures it is a copy or version of a much older Greek original that was well known, in this case a bronze by Lysippos (or one of his circle) that would have been made in the fourth century BC. This original survived for over 1500 years until it was melted down by Crusaders in 1205 during the Sack of Constantinople. The enlarged copy was made for the Baths of Caracalla in Rome (dedicated in 216 AD), where the statue was recovered in 1546, and is now in the Museo Archeologico Nazionale in Naples. The heroically-scaled Hercules is one of the most famous sculptures of antiquity, and has fixed the image of the mythic hero in the European imagination.

The Farnese Hercules is a massive marble statue, following a lost original that was cast in bronze through a method called lost wax casting. It depicts a muscular, yet weary, Hercules leaning on his club, which has the skin of the Nemean lion draped over it. In myths about Heracles, killing the lion was his first task. He has just performed one of the last of The Twelve Labours, which is suggested by the apples of the Hesperides he holds behind his back.

The type was well known in antiquity, and among many other versions a Hellenistic or Roman bronze reduction, found at Foligno is in the Musée du Louvre. A small Roman marble copy can be seen over the Museum of the Ancient Agora, Athens (see illustration).

== Description ==
Hercules is depicted in a moment of rest, but full of strength. Leaning on his gnarled club, which is draped in the skin of the Nemean lion, he holds the golden apples stolen from the Hesperides, hiding them behind his back, in his right hand.

Details

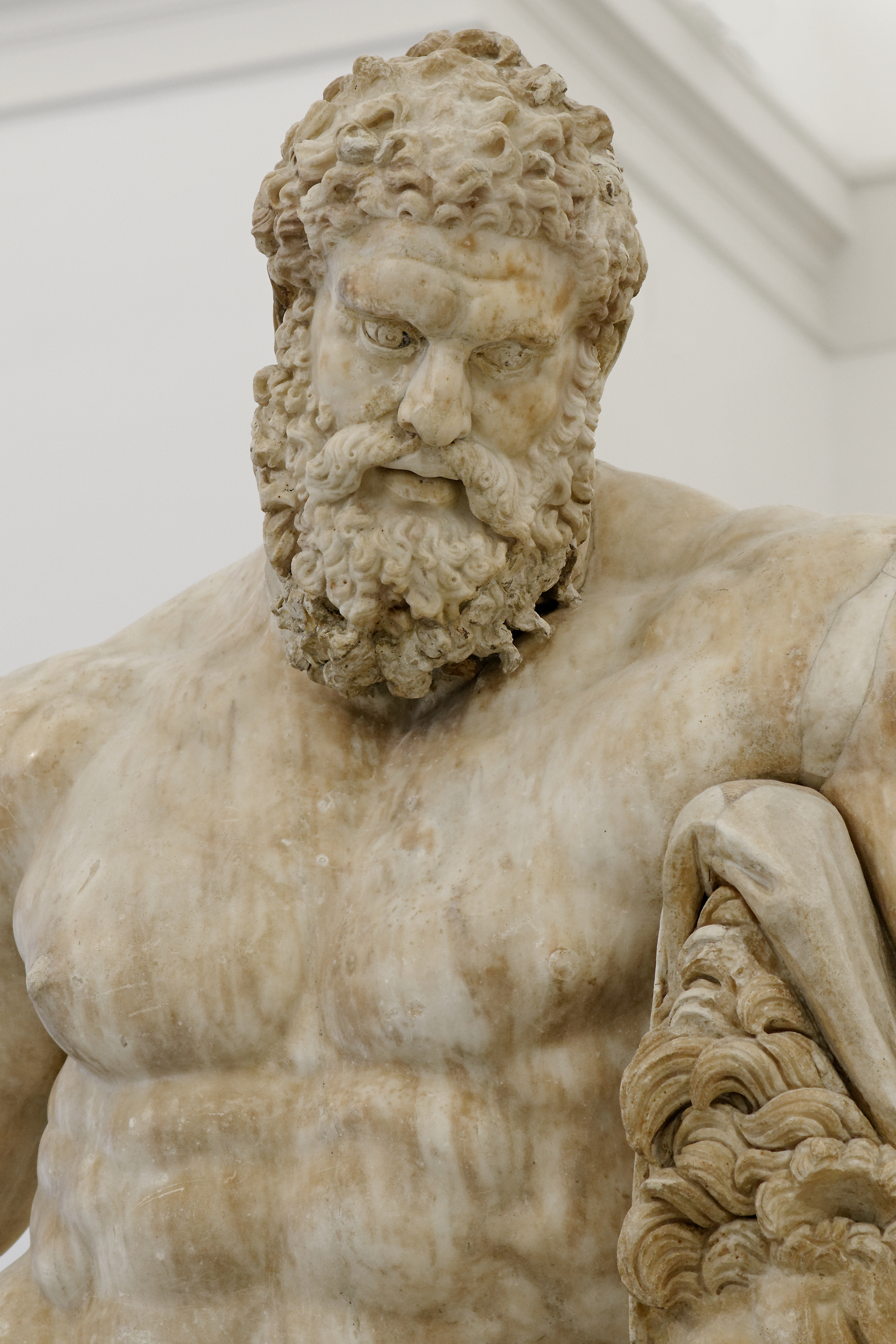
Face

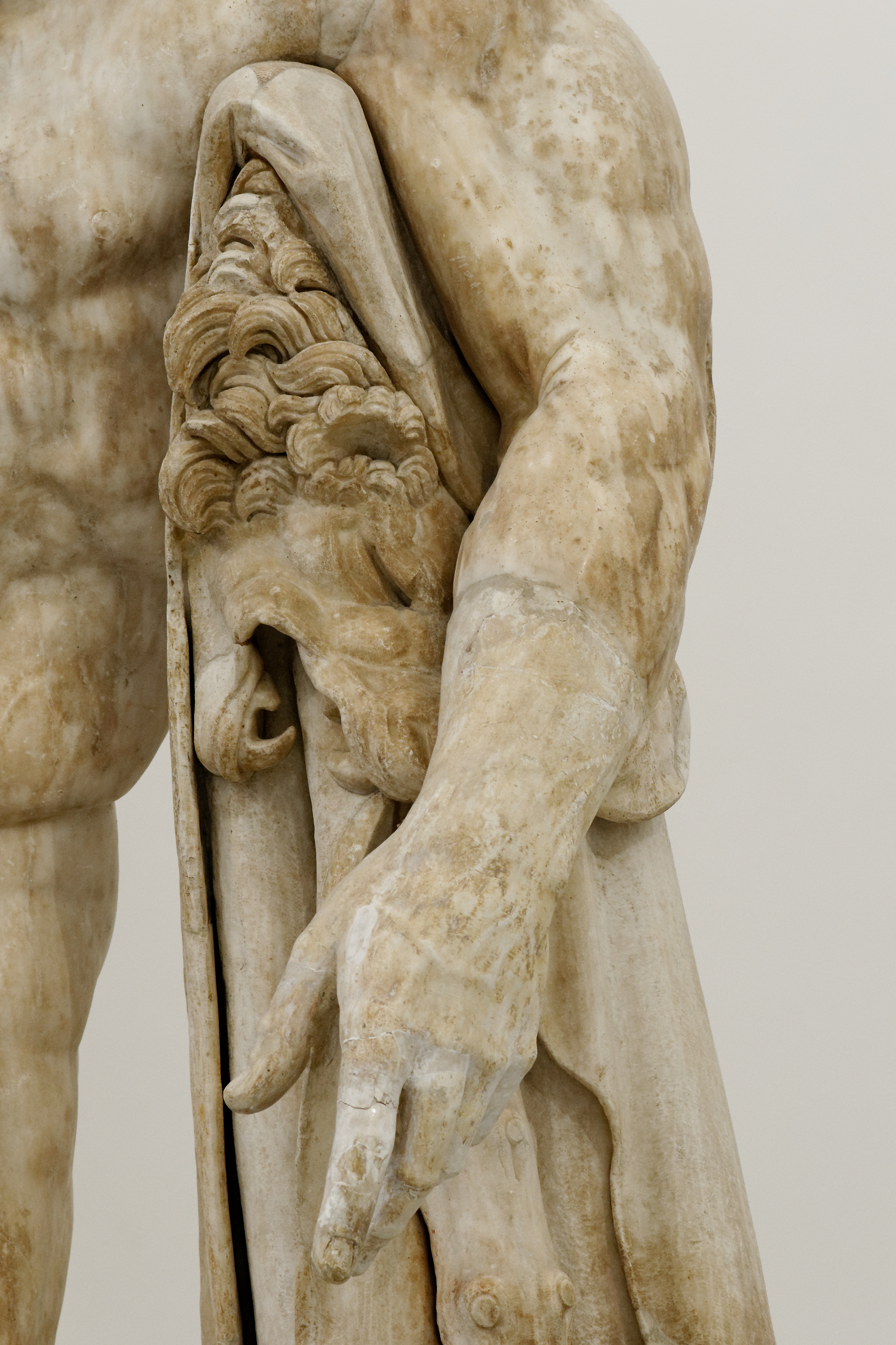
Left arm leaning on the club

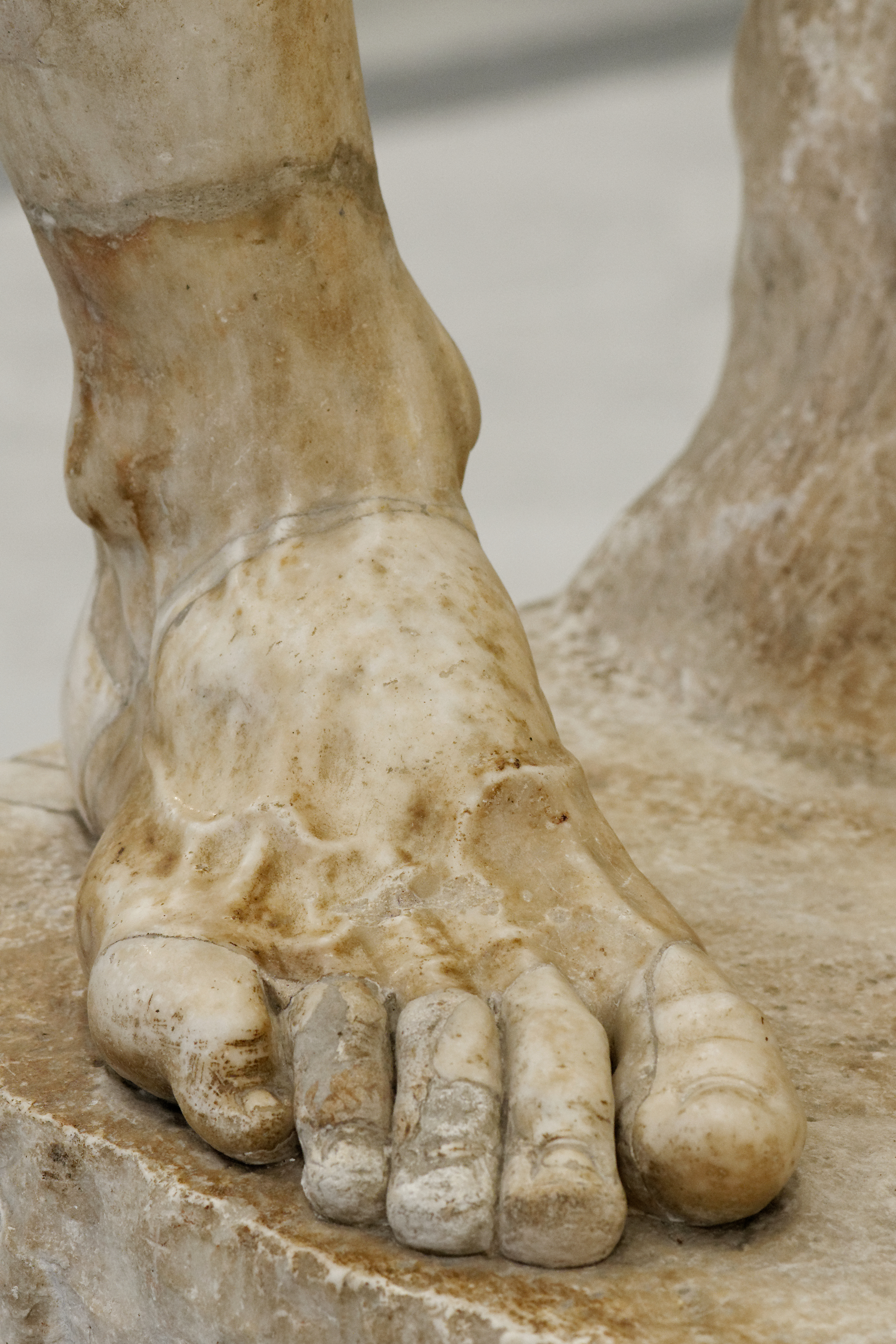
Right foot

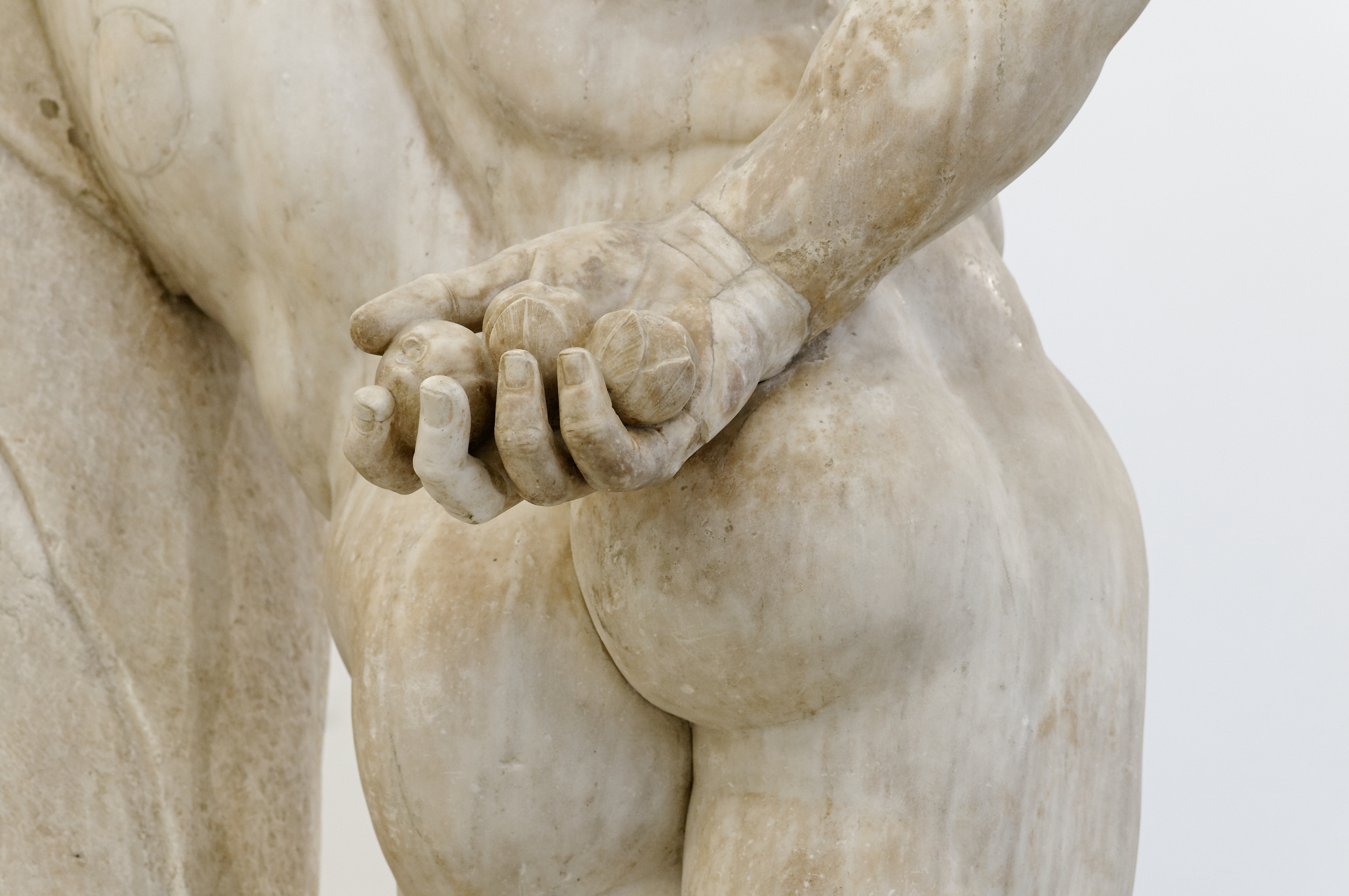
Right hand behind the back with the apples.

== History ==
The rediscovered statue quickly made its way into the collection of Cardinal Alessandro Farnese, grandson of Pope Paul III. Alessandro Farnese was well placed to form one of the greatest collections of classical sculpture that had been assembled since antiquity. It stood for generations in its own room at Palazzo Farnese, Rome, where the statue was surrounded by frescoed depictions of the hero's mythical feats that were created by Annibale Carracci and his studio, executed in the 1590s. The Farnese statue was moved to Naples in 1787 with most of the Farnese Collection and is now displayed there in the Museo Archeologico Nazionale.

The sculpture has been reassembled and restored by degrees. According to a letter by Guglielmo della Porta, the head was found separately in a well in Trastevere. It was bought for the Farnese collection through della Porta's help. He also made replacement legs to complete the figure. These legs were so well regarded that when the original legs were later found at the Baths of Caracalla, della Porta's were kept. This was on Michelangelo's advice—to show that modern sculptors could match the ancients. The original legs ended up in the Borghese collection and were not reunited with the statue until 1787. Goethe wrote about the statue in his Italian Journey. He described seeing it with both sets of legs and was amazed at how much better the original ones were.

Hercules is caught in a rare moment of repose. Leaning on his knobby club, which is draped with the pelt of the Nemean lion, he holds the apples of the Hesperides, but conceals them behind his back, cradled in his right hand. Many engravings and woodcuts spread the fame of the Farnese's Hercules. By 1562, the find was already included in the set of engravings for Speculum Romanae Magnificentiae ("Mirror of Rome's Magnificence") and connoisseurs, artists, and tourists gaped at the original, which stood in the courtyard of the Palazzo Farnese, protected under the arcade. In 1590–91, during his trip to Rome, Hendrik Goltzius sketched the statue in the palazzo courtyard. Later (in 1591), Goltzius recorded the less-common rear view, in a bravura engraving (illustration, right), which emphasizes the already bulky muscular form with swelling and tapering lines that flow over the contours. The young Rubens made quick sketches of the planes and massing of the statue of Hercules. Before photography, prints were the only way to put the image into many hands.

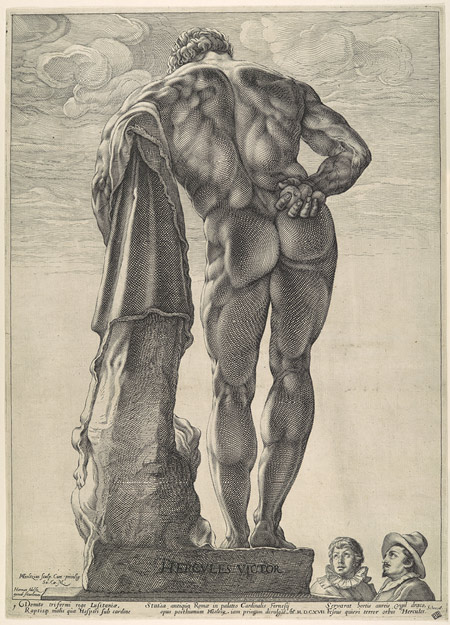
The Farnese Hercules, engraved by Hendrick Goltzius, 1591. Two onlookers give scale

The sculpture was admired from the start, reservations about its "exaggerated" musculature only surfacing in the later eighteenth century. Napoleon remarked to Antonio Canova that its omission from the museum he accumulated in Paris was the most important gap in the collection. More than once, the sculpture was crated and made ready for shipment to Paris before the Napoleonic regime fled Naples.

== List of other ancient copies ==
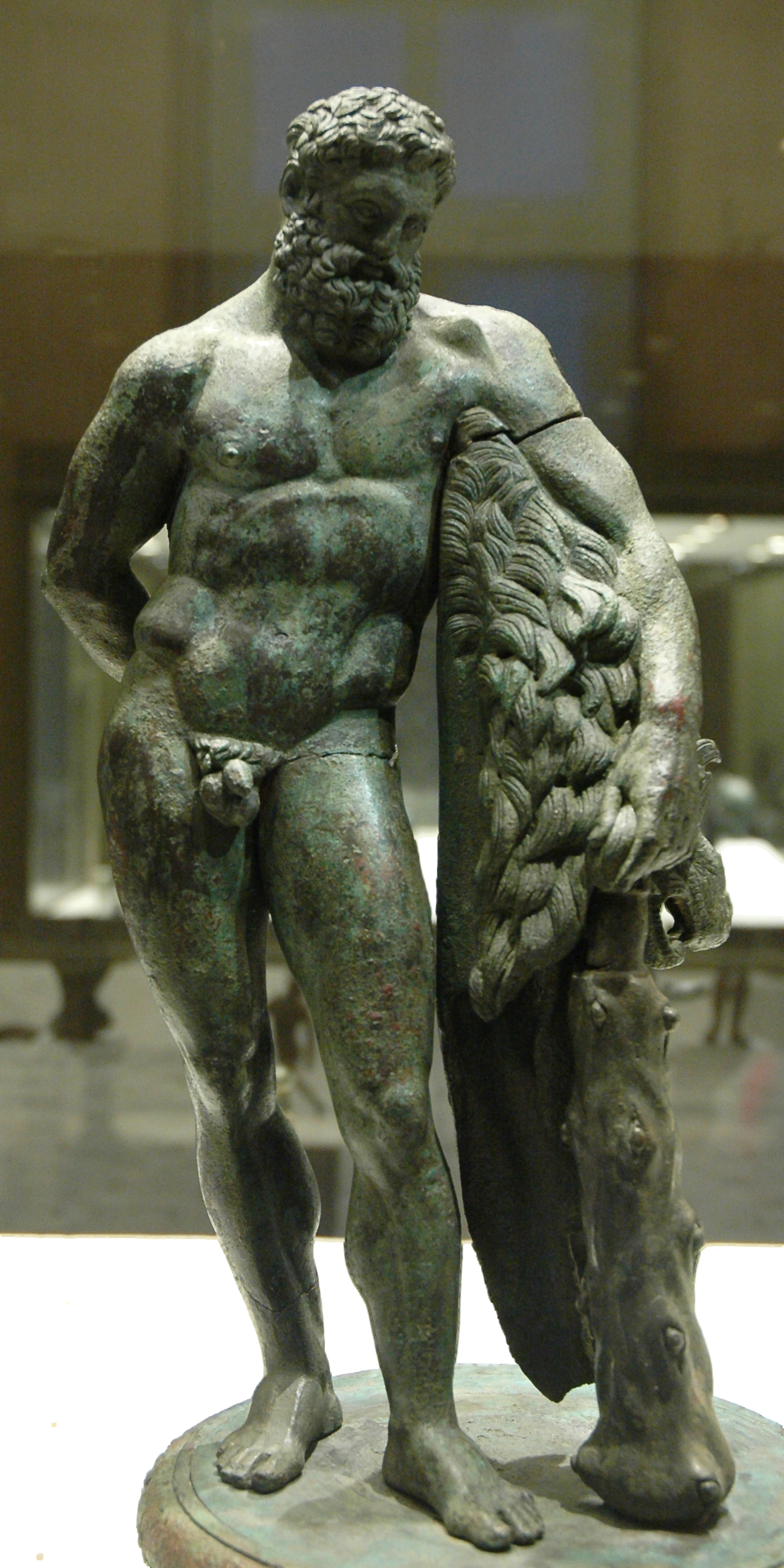
Late Classical Greek bronze version, found at Foligno (Musée du Louvre)

The prominently sited statue was well liked by the Ancient Romans, and copies have been found in Roman palaces and gymnasiums: another, coarser copy stood in the courtyard of Palazzo Farnese; another with the feigned (but probably ancient) inscription "Lykippos", has stood in the court of Palazzo Pitti, Florence, since the sixteenth century. Ancient copies of the statue include:

- Hercules, 2nd century AD, Roman copy, Uffizi Gallery, Florence
- The "Weary Herakles", a heavily broken Roman marble statue excavated in 1980 in Perge, Turkey. The looted upper torso was sold to the Museum of Fine Arts, Boston in 1981. It was returned to Turkey in 2011 and is now displayed at the Antalya Museum
- Colossal statue of Hercules, uncovered at the baths in Hippo Regius (Annaba), Algeria
- Resting Herakles, Hermitage, Saint Petersburg
- Heracles of Antikythera, badly damaged late Hellenistic Parian marble headless statue, recovered from the Antikythera Shipwreck in 1901, now in the National Archaeological Museum, Athens
- Headless statue at Izmit Archaeology and Ethnography Museum
- Broken headless torso found in the Roman and Byzantine village bathhouse in the Jezreel Valley
- Broken headless torso from the Amphiareion of Oropos, Athens, National Archaeological Museum
- Broken headless torso of 2nd or 3rd century AD, in the Museum of Saint-Raymond, Toulouse
- Statuette of 2nd century AD, in the Detroit Institute of Arts
- Bronze statuette with silver-inlaid eyes of 40–70 AD, Getty Villa

== Later copies ==
After rediscovery of the Farnese Hercules, copies appeared in sixteenth and eighteenth-century gardens throughout Europe. During construction of the Alameda de Hercules (1574) in Seville, the oldest public garden preserved in Europe, at its entrance were installed two columns from a Roman temple, elements of a building still preserved in the Mármoles, an unquestionable sign of admiration for the Roman archaeological sites. On them were placed two sculptures by Diego de Pesquera, in 1574, recognizing Hercules as founder of the city, and Julius Caesar, restorer of Híspalis. The statue of Hercules was a copy of the Farnese Hercules, nearly as large as the original. At Wilhelmshöhe, near Kassel, a colossal version 8.5 m high produced by Johann Jacob Anthoni, 1713–1717, has become a symbol for the city.

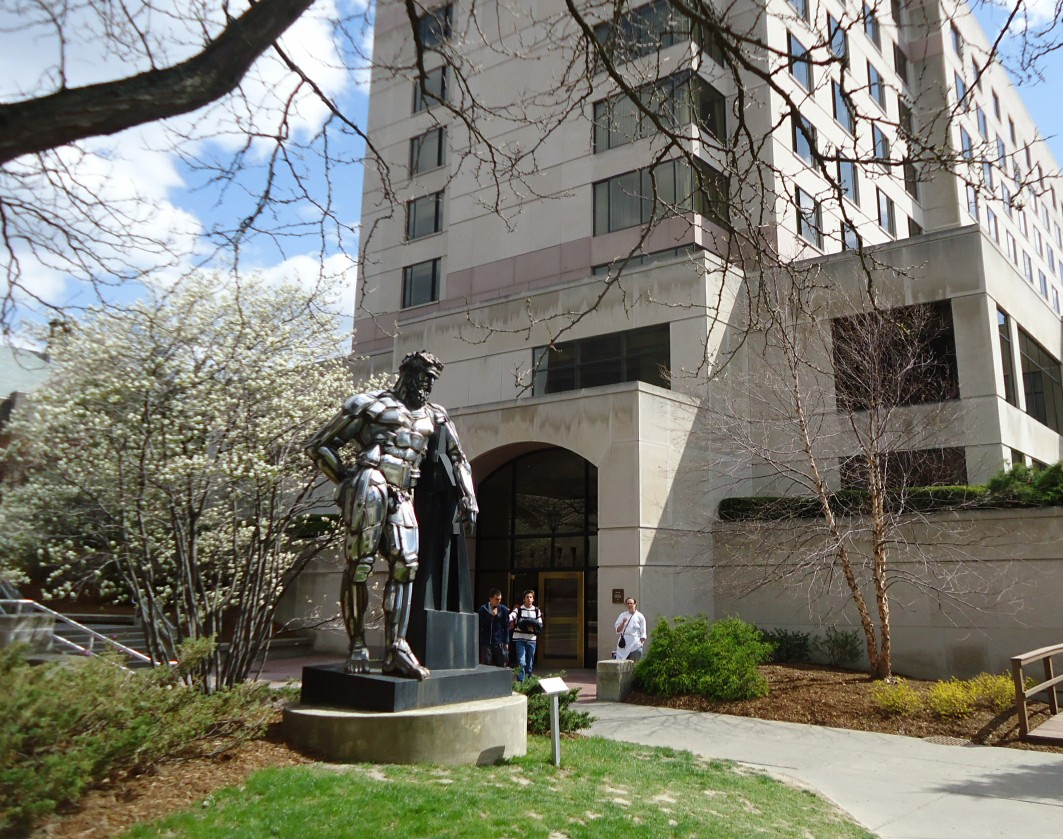
Herakles in Ithaka I, at Cornell University

André Le Nôtre placed a full-size gilded version against the skyline at the far end of the main vista at Vaux-le-Vicomte. At the Palace of Versailles is a copy by Jean Cornu (1684–86). In Scotland a copy made in lead in 1743 by John Cheere is sited incongruously in the central Highlands, overlooking the recently restored Hercules Garden in the grounds of Blair Castle. A further early eighteenth-century lead copy can be found in England, at the Quarry in Shrewsbury. Wealthy collectors were able to afford any one of numerous bronze replicas, created in various sizes for free-standing or table-top display.

The statue is shown in the 1954 film Journey to Italy along with the Farnese Bull.

A replica, titled Herakles in Ithaka I, was erected in 1989 on the campus of Cornell University in Ithaca, NY. The statue was a gift from its sculptor, Jason Seley, a professor of fine arts. Seley created the sculpture in 1981 out of chrome automobile bumpers.

The statue has inspired artists such as Jeff Koons and Matthew Darbyshire to create their own versions in plaster and polystyrene, respectively. Their use of white materials to re-create the sculpture has been interpreted by classicist Aimee Hinds as a perpetuation of colourism in classical art.

A copy of the sculpture is among the ten statues adorning the front yard of the Schlossgarten in Karlsruhe, Germany.
