= Naval ram =

Naval melee weapon

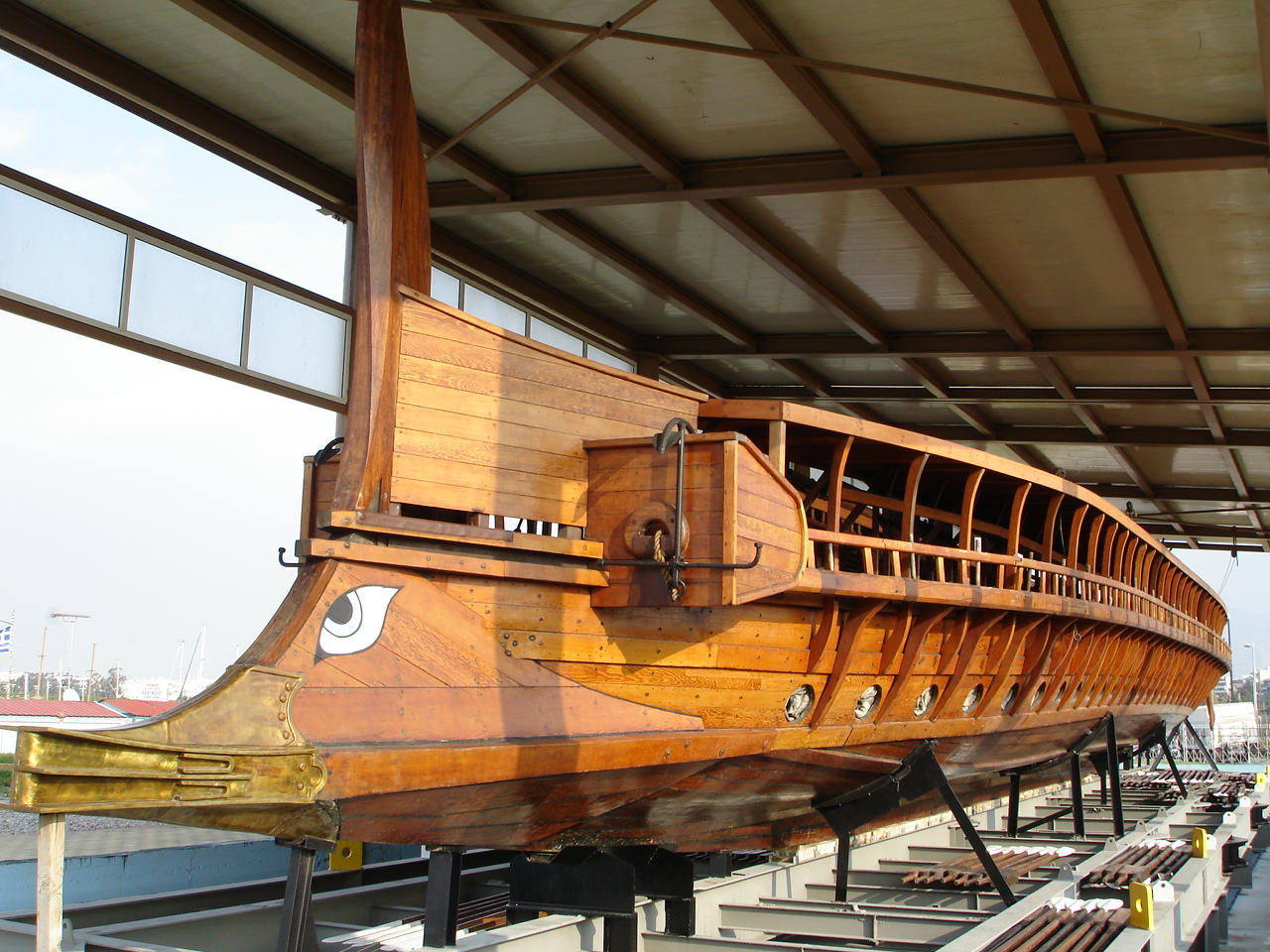
A ram on the bow of Olympias, a modern reconstruction of an ancient Athenian trireme

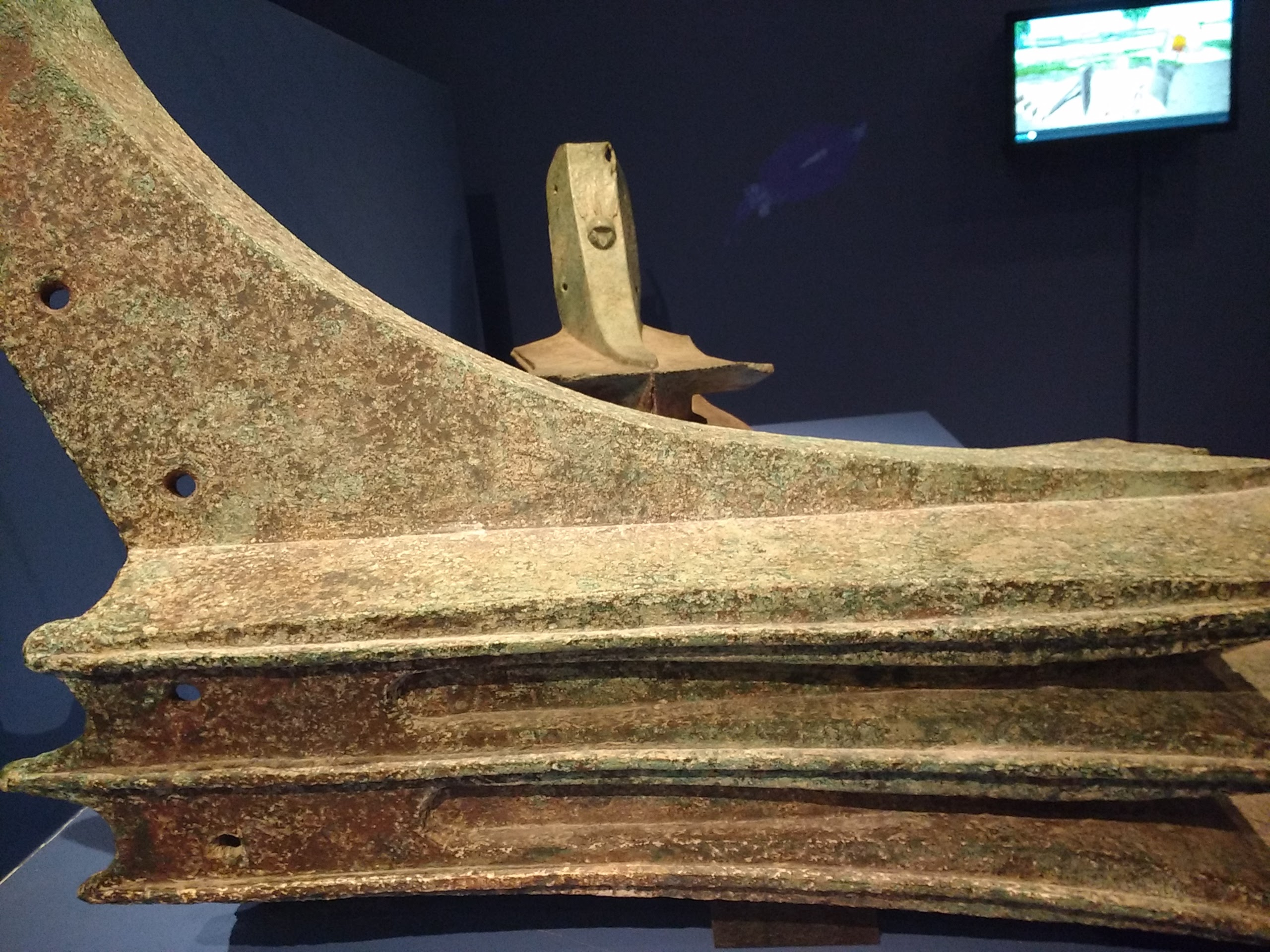
Lateral view

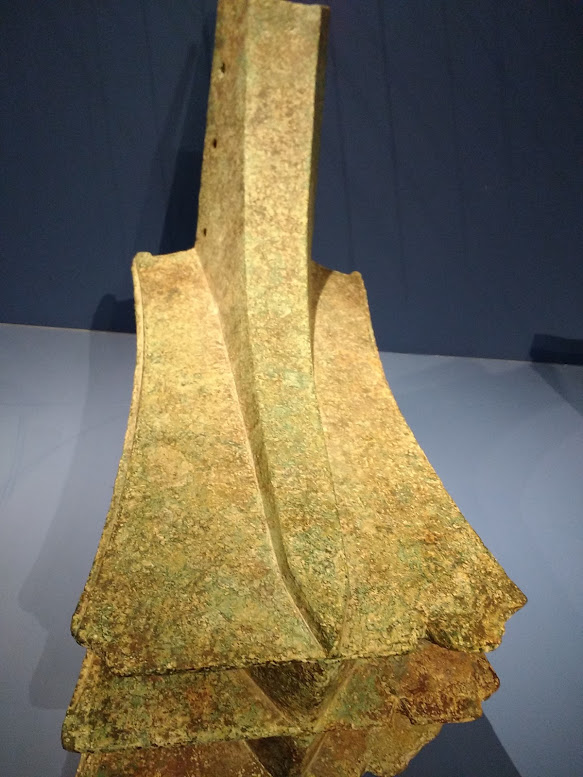
Frontal view

Carthaginian naval ram from the Battle of the Aegates (First Punic War, 241 BC) discovered in 2010 at a depth of 80 meters. Damage attributed to collision(s) with Roman ships (ram against ram) can be seen in front view. It carries a 35-character Punic inscription, offered as a supplication to the god Baal

A naval ram is a weapon fitted to varied types of ships, dating back to antiquity. The weapon comprised an underwater prolongation of the bow of the ship to form an armoured beak, usually between 2 and 4 meters (6.6 and 13.1 ft) in length. This would be driven into the hull of an enemy ship to puncture, sink or disable it.

== Antiquity ==
It was possibly developed in late Bronze Age Egypt, but it only became widely used in later Iron Age Mediterranean galleys. The ram was a naval weapon in the Greek/Roman antiquity and was used in such naval battles as Salamis and Actium. Naval warfare in the Mediterranean rarely used sails, and the use of rams specifically required oarsmen rather than sails in order to maneuver with accuracy and speed, and particularly to reverse the movement of a ramming ship to disentangle it from its sinking victim, lest it be pulled down when its victim sank. The Athenians were especially known for their diekplous and periplous tactics that disabled enemy ships with speed and ramming techniques.

Rams were first recorded in use at the battle of Alalia in 535 BC. There is evidence available to suggest that it existed much earlier, probably even before the 8th century BC. They appear first on stylized images found on Greek pottery and jewelry and on Assyrian reliefs and paintings. The ram most likely evolved from cutwaters, structures designed to support the keel-stem joint and allow for greater speed and dynamism in the water. Rams were supported by bulkheads, formed by enclosing the bow behind the ram. Instead of using bulkheads to protect ships against ram attacks, Greeks reinforced the hull with extra timber along the waterline, making larger ships almost resistant to ramming by smaller ones.

No later than the 7th century AD, rams were no longer used in the Mediterranean and the knowledge of the design of the ancient triremes had been forgotten. Medieval galleys instead developed a projection, or "spur", in the bow that was designed to break oars and to act as a boarding platform for storming enemy ships. The only remaining examples of ramming tactics were passing references to attempts to collide with ships in order to destabilize or capsize them.

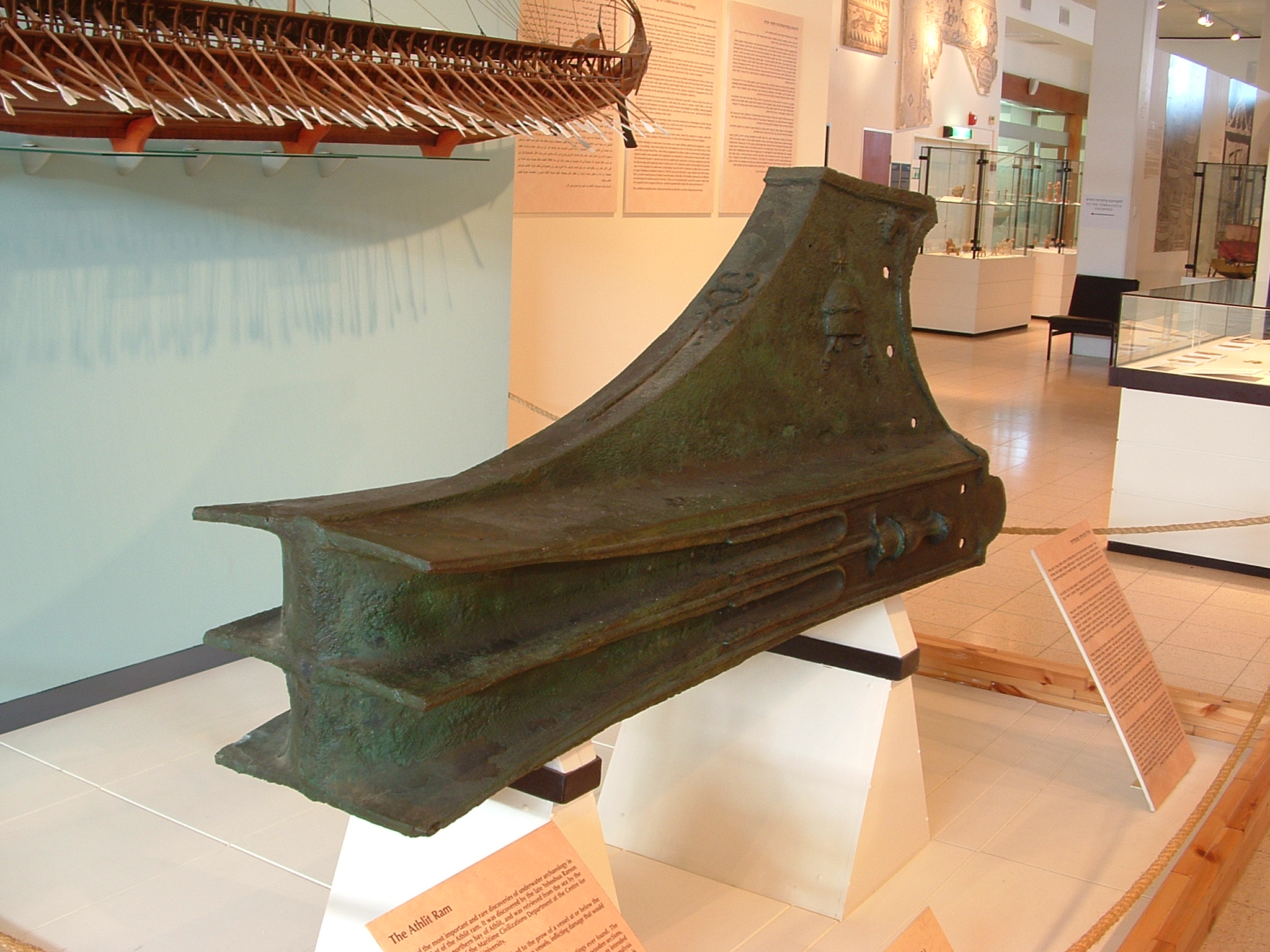
Front view

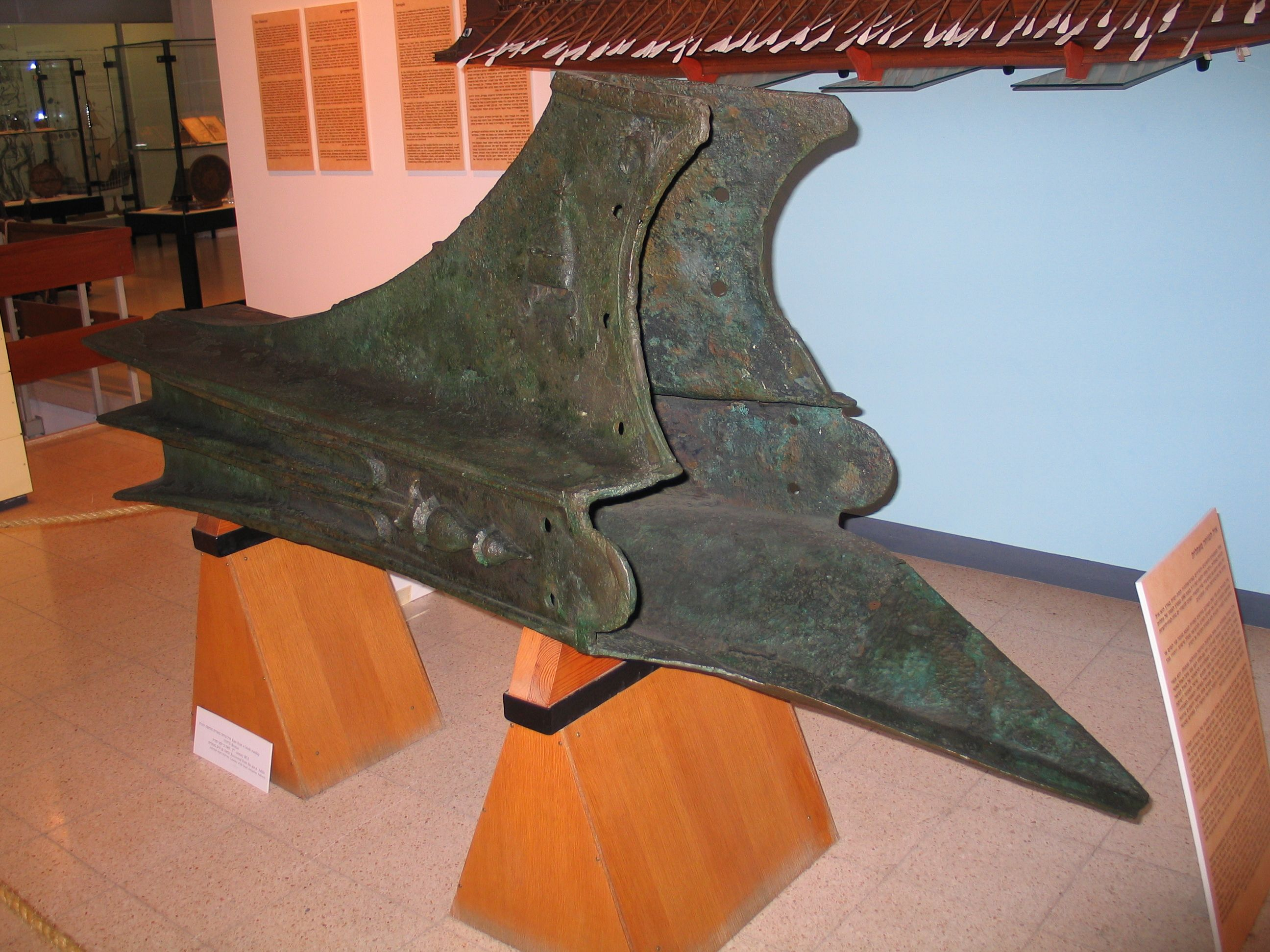
Rear view

The Athlit ram, Israeli National Maritime Museum

The Athlit ram, found in 1980 off the coast of Israel near Atlit, is an example of an ancient ram. Carbon 14 dating of timber remnants date it to between 530 BC and 270 BC.

Rams are believed to be one of the main weapons of war galleys from around the 6th or 5th century BC, and the Athlit ram's construction implies advanced technology that was developed over a long period of time. Heavy timbers were shaped and attached to the hull, and then the bronze ram was created to fit around the timbers for added strength. The evidence for this lies in the remnants of timbers found inside the Athlit ram when it was discovered. The blunt edge of the ram and the patterned protrusion were intended to break open the seams of the target ship while at the same time dispersing the force of impact on the attacking ship to prevent the ram from twisting off and damaging the attacking ship. It was also less likely to become stuck in the hull of its target.

The Athlit ram consists of a single bronze casting weighing 465 kilograms (1,025 lb). It is 226 centimetres (89 in) long with a maximum width of 76 centimetres (30 in) and a maximum height of 96 centimetres (38 in). The bronze that makes up the shell is a high-quality alloy containing 9.78% tin with traces of lead and other elements. The shell was cast as a single piece to match the timbers it protected. The casting of an object as large as the Athlit ram was a complicated operation at the time, and would have been a considerable expense in the construction of a war galley.

The most likely casting method would have been the lost wax technique, which was commonly used for statues and other large casting during this period. Flaws toward the rear of the casting indicate that it was cast "head down" so the best quality of metal was at the very front of the ram. Voids, bubbles, and insufficient filling in the initial casting were repaired using both "plugs" that were hammered into holes, and "casting on" where a new clay mould was built around the flaws and additional molten metal poured in.

The ram can be divided into roughly three sections: the driving centre, the bottom plate, and the cowl. The driving centre is 30 centimetres (12 in) long and 76 centimetres (30 in) wide. This is the area of the ram that makes contact with enemy vessels in battle. The front wall of the head of the ram has the thickest layer of casting at 6.8 centimetres (2.7 in) for extra protection during battle. The surface of the ram was decorated with several symbols. On both sides, there is an eagle head, a thunderbolt, and a helmet surmounted by an eight-point star. The eagle symbols are similar in dimension, but contain many inconsistencies with each other, whereas the helmet and thunderbolt are highly identical, suggesting they were duplicates made from a primary mold before being made part of the final wax master. The ram was attached with mortise and tenon joints and strengthened with 15-millimetre (0.6 in) oak pegs. The wales and the ramming timber are designed to interlock for extra strength. The bottom of the ram features a mortise cut into the ramming timber to fit the most forward end of the keel which was formed into a 4-centimetre (1.6 in) thick and 10-centimetre (3.9 in) long tenon.

== Early modern rams ==
In 1727, during the Anglo-Spanish War, Spanish engineer Juan de Ochoa proposed King Philip V his project of the barcaza-espín ("barge-porcupine"). These vessels were effectively floating batteries moved by rows and fitted with multiple naval rams, a main one in its prow and eight smaller around its body, which was the reason behind their name. The project was never built, however.

== Steam rams ==
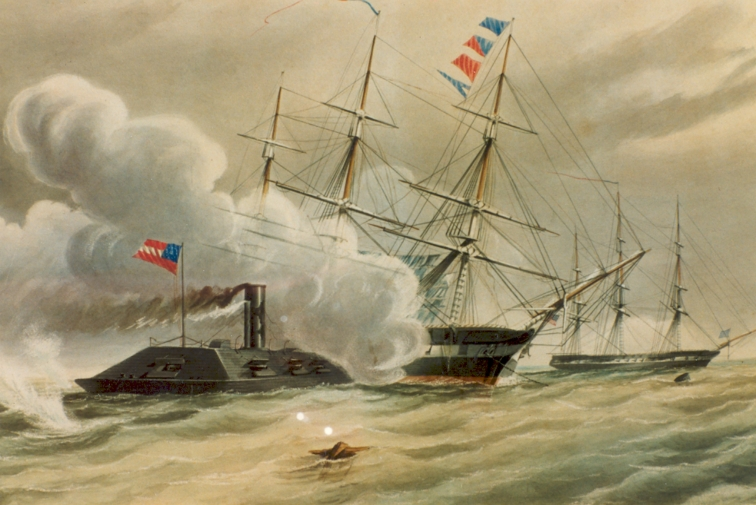
CSS Virginia ramming and sinking the USS Cumberland

With the development of steam propulsion, the speed, power and maneuverability it allowed again enabled the use of the ship's hull, which could be clad in iron, as an offensive weapon. As early as 1840, the French admiral Nicolas Hippolyte Labrousse proposed building a ram steamship, and by 1860, Dupuy de Lôme had designed an ironclad with a ram. The quick success of CSS Virginia's ramming attack on USS Cumberland at the Battle of Hampton Roads in 1862 attracted much attention and caused many navies to re-think the ram. The first coastal battleship, France's Taureau, was built in 1863, for the purpose of attacking warships at anchor or in narrow straits, and was armed with a ram. Many ironclad ships were designed specifically to ram opponents; in ships of this type, the armour belt was extended forward to brace both sides of the ram to increase structural integrity. Several wooden steamships were purpose-built as rams, or converted from existing commercial vessels, such as General Price.

The theory behind the revival of the weapon derived from the fact that, in the period c. 1860, armour held superiority over the ship-mounted cannon. It was believed that an armoured warship could not be seriously damaged by the naval artillery in existence at the time, even at close range. To achieve a decisive result in a naval engagement, therefore, alternative methods of action were believed to be necessary. As it followed, from the same belief, that a ship armed with a ram could not be seriously damaged by the gunfire of its intended victim, the ram became, for a brief period, the main armament of many battleships. It was observed that the guns placed on the Taureau were there "with the sole function of preparing the way for the ram."

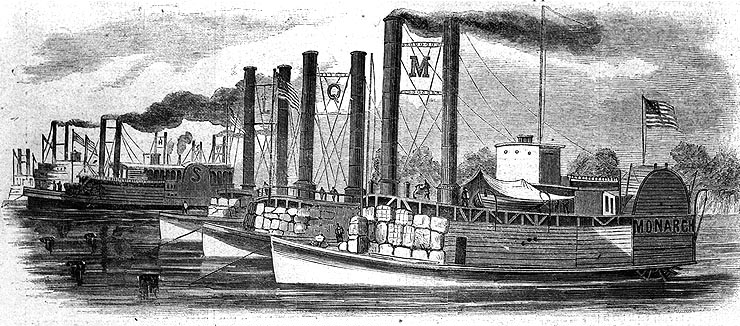
The United States Ram Fleet was created by Charles Ellet, Jr. from nine converted commercial steamships

During the American Civil War, both Union and Confederate forces employed ram ships. In 1862, Charles Ellet, Jr. was deployed directly by the Secretary of War, Edwin M. Stanton, to build the United States Ram Fleet, a fleet of ram ships to counter the Confederate River Defense Fleet controlling the Mississippi River. Ellet purchased nine steam powered paddle boats and retrofit them for service as ram ships. The ram ships played an important part in the Union victory during the First Battle of Memphis and helped the Union forces wrest control of the Mississippi River from the Confederate forces.

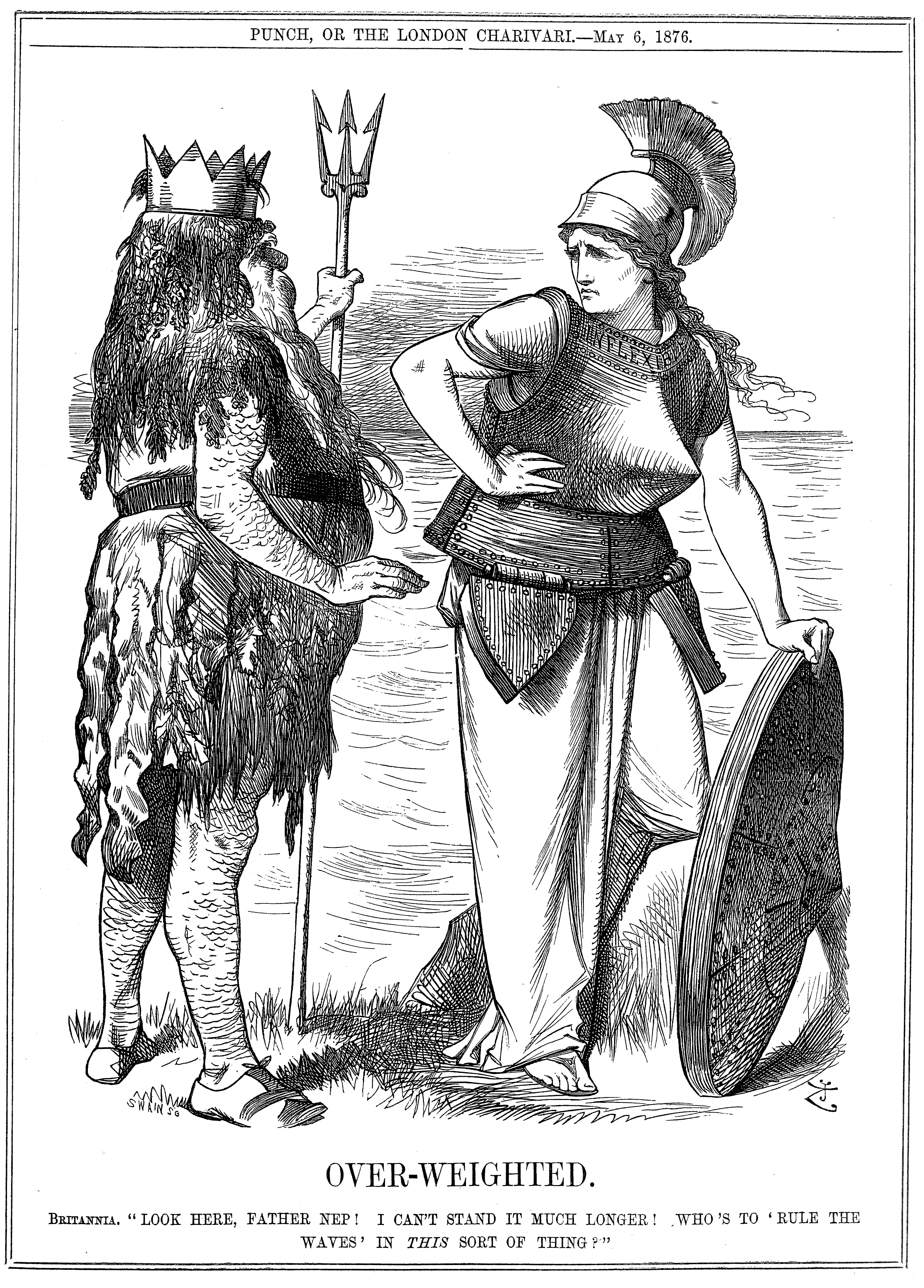
An 1876 cartoon from the magazine Punch, ridiculing rams.

The frequent use of ramming as a tactic in the American Civil War, the Battle of Lissa and, to a lesser extent, at the Battle of Iquique also led to many late 19th-century naval designers equipping their warships with ram bows. According to Geoffrey Wawro, the world navies took the wrong lessons from Lissa: most Austrian ramming attempts failed since steam propulsion allowed the Italian warships to quickly perform evasive maneuvers, while the ironclad Re d'Italia was only rammed and sunk after her rudder was disabled by gunfire. In a 1894 essay, William Laird Clowes criticized the use of naval rams: out of 74 ramming attempts between 1861 and 1879, 36 caused no damage at all, 18 resulted in light damage, and only 20 resulted in heavy damage or loss to either rammer or its target. Clowes also concluded that several of these sinkings happened after accidental collisions between friendly vessels during peacetime, though ram advocates used these mishaps to argue that rams could be effective in engagements.

"My general conclusions, so far as I can hastily formulate them, would be these:-1. That attempted ramming is not dangerous to a rammee when there is sea room, and when the ship is under control. 2. That attempted ramming is always dangerous to the rammer-I mean in action -but, as a rule, only dangerous to the rammee where ships are in narrow waters or where the rammee is not under control. But, even where the rammee is not under control, ramming, besides being dangerous to the rammer, is really unnecessary, since there are generally other ways of dealing with a ship that can neither steer nor steam. She ought certainly to be made a prize. The next conclusion would be that, since in accidental ramming the ram is notoriously dangerous, and since in cases of intentional ramming it has been shown to be not nearly so dangerous, therefore the ram (or, at least, the projecting ram) as a weapon is more dangerous to friend than foe, and might advantageously be got rid of."

— William Laird Clowes, "The Ram in Action and in Accident", United States Naval Institute Proceedings, Volume 20 (1894), p. 107

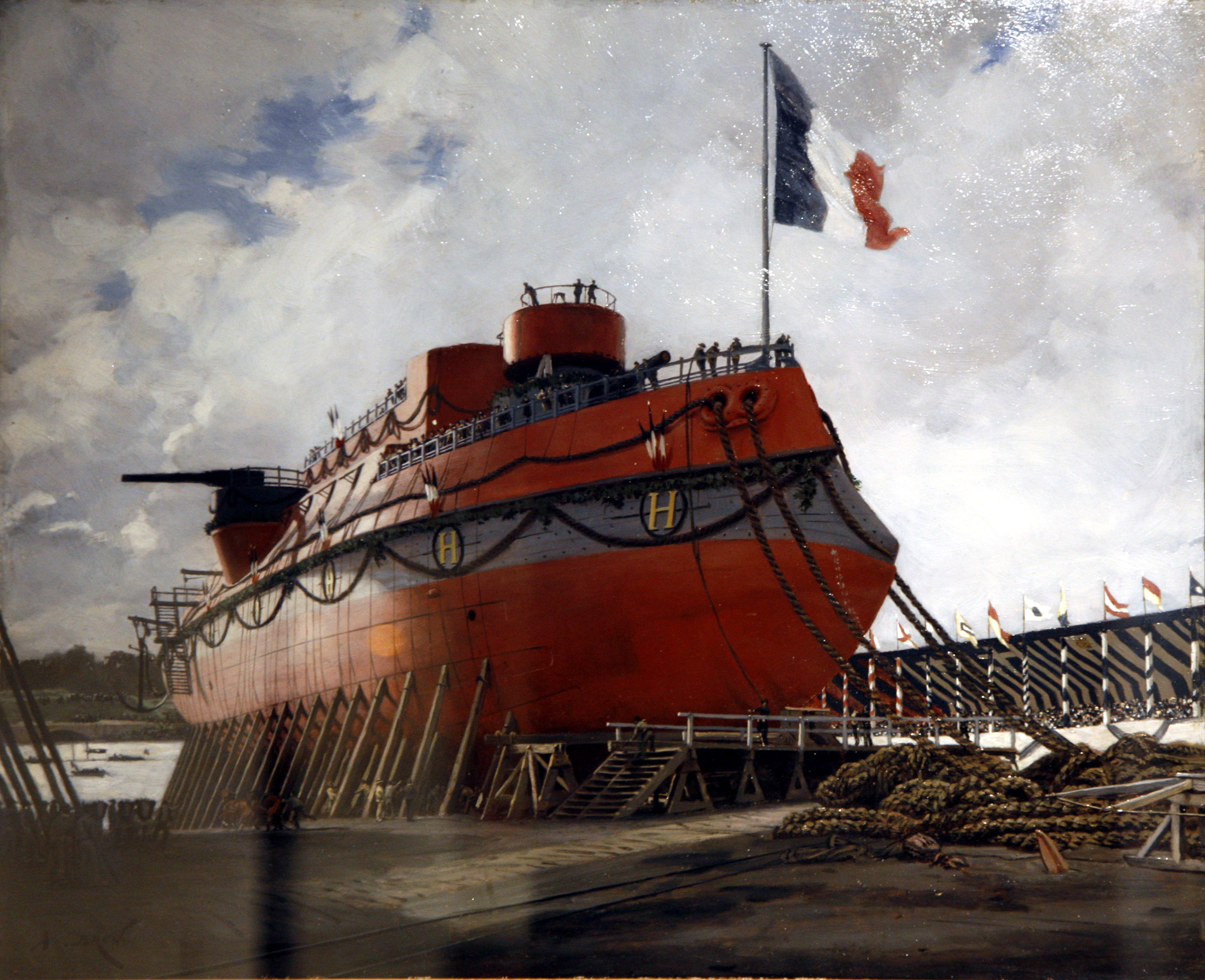
The launch of the French ironclad Hoche in 1886, showing the prominent ram bow.

No other ironclad was ever sunk by wartime ramming by an enemy ship, although the ram was regarded by all major navies for some 30 years as primary battleship armament. A number of ships were, however, rammed in peacetime by ships of their own navy. The most serious of these same-navy collisions in terms of loss of life was the collision between HMS Victoria and HMS Camperdown, which took place in the Mediterranean in 1893. A total of 358 seamen lost their lives in the incident. However, that death toll was dwarfed by the 562 deaths (plus two rescuers) ensuing from the sinking of the passenger liner SS Utopia, which accidentally collided with the ram bow of the anchored HMS Anson in 1891.

After a Japanese fleet destroyed the Baltic Fleet at the Battle of Tsushima with gunfire, the ram was completely abandoned with the advent of HMS Dreadnought (1906), which used an inverted bow (superficially resembling a ram) to improve performance.

== Torpedo rams ==
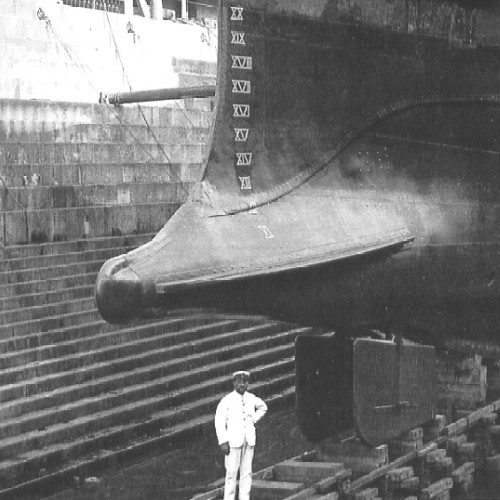
HMS Polyphemus's ram

The torpedo ram is a hybrid torpedo boat combining a ram with torpedo tubes. Incorporating design elements from the cruiser and the monitor, it was intended to provide a small and inexpensive weapon systems for coastal defence and other littoral combat.

Like monitors, torpedo rams operated with very little freeboard, sometimes with only inches of hull rising above the water, exposing only their funnels and turrets to direct enemy fire. They were equipped with torpedoes and guns in turrets. Early designs incorporated a spar torpedo that could be extended from the bow and detonated by ramming a target. Later designs used tube-launched self-propelled torpedoes, but retained the concept of ramming, resulting in designs like HMS Polyphemus, which had five torpedo tubes, two each port and starboard and one mounted in the centre of her reinforced ram bow.

== Civilian use ==
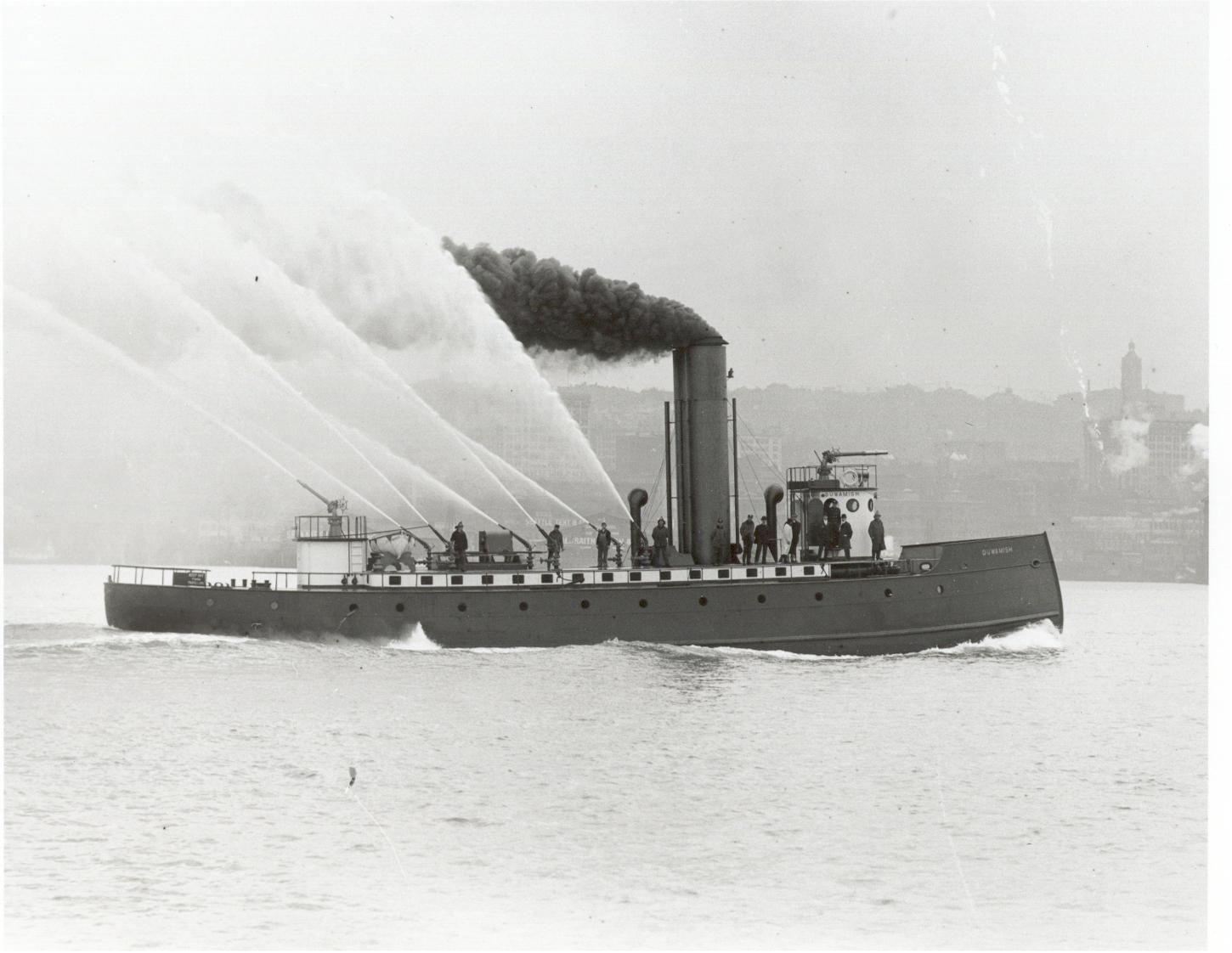
Originally the Seattle fireboat Duwamish was built with a 'ram' bow

Rams have also been used on civilian vessels. The Seattle fireboat Duwamish, built in 1909, was designed to ram burning wooden vessels, as a last resort.

== Experimental archaeology ==
From 2021 to 2023, a team of nautical archaeologists from Texas A&M University successfully cast an ancient trireme-sized naval ram based on ancient methods. The project consisted of three major steps to replicate the construction process: false bow construction, beeswax model creation, and lost-wax casting. The purpose of the experimental reconstruction was to better understand the time, manpower, and materials needed to create naval rams which helped to understand the economic, social, and political apparatuses of ancient navies. The reconstructed naval ram, called the "DeCasien ram" after its builder Stephen DeCasien, is currently housed at the Center for Maritime Archaeology and Conservation (CMAC) at Texas A&M University.

== See also ==
- Bulbous bow – Protruding bulb at the front of a ship
- Corvus (boarding device) – Roman military boarding device
- Dolphin (weapon) – Ancient Greek weaponized anchor
- Inverted bow – Bow whose furthest forward point is not at the top
- Marine archaeology – Archaeological study of human interaction with the sea
- Ramming#Naval warfare – Military combat technique
- Rostra – Ancient Roman platform for speakers
- Rostral column – Naval victory monument
