= Heracles of Antikythera =

Greek statue

- Ηρακλής των Αντικυθήρων (Greek)
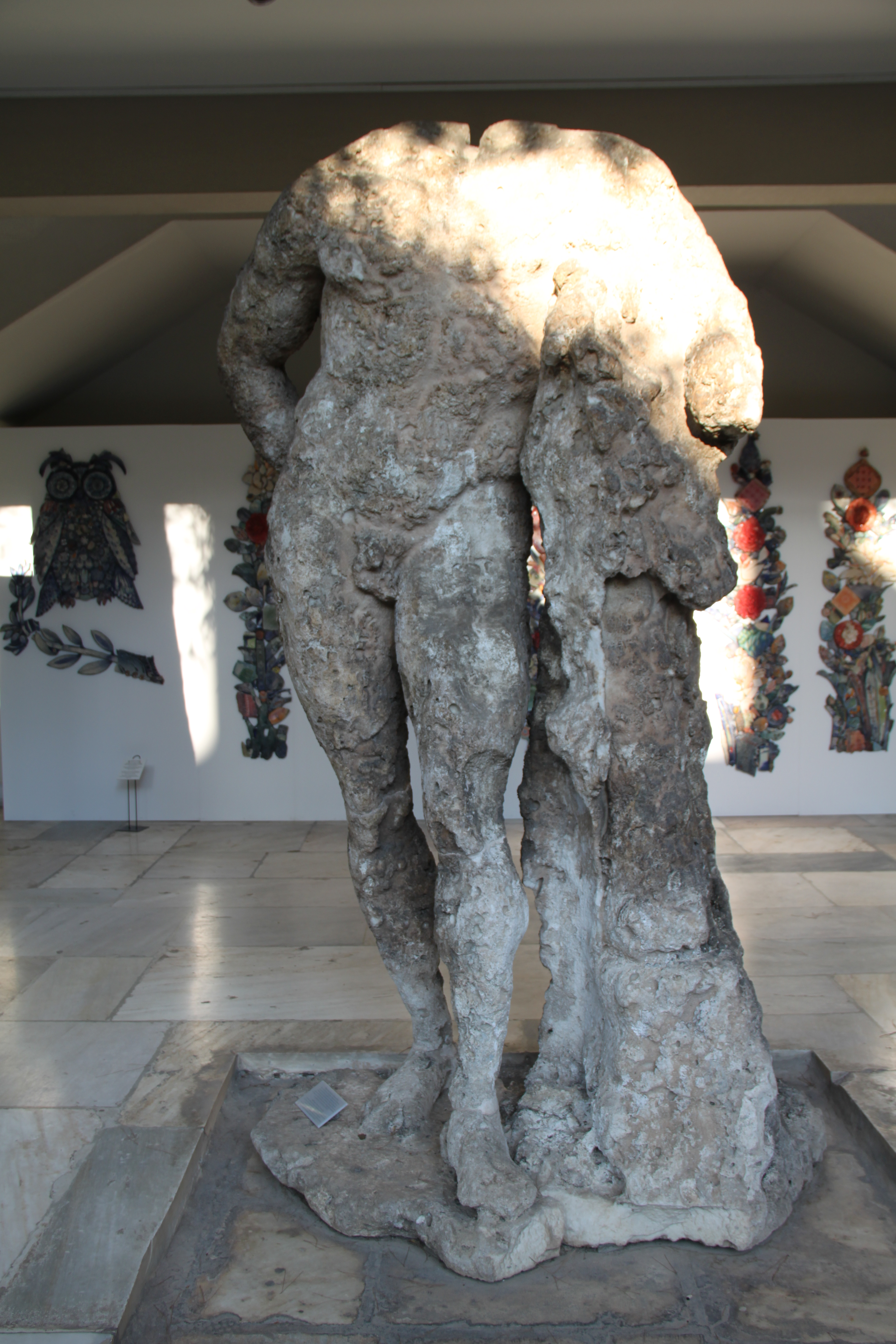
- The statue in the NAMA
- Year: 4th century BC
- Catalogue: No 5742
- Medium: Marble
- Movement: Hellenistic
- Subject: Heracles resting
- Dimensions: 2.50 m (98 in)
- Condition: Head missing; marble eroded
- Location: National Archaeological Museum, Athens
- Owner: Greece
- Website: https://www.namuseum.gr/

The Heracles of Antikythera (Greek: Ηρακλής των Αντικυθήρων) is a large ancient Greek marble sculpture of the Greek hero Heracles, found in the wreck of Antikythera among several other findings, and now housed in the National Archaeological Museum of Athens.

== Description ==
After spending centuries at the bottom of the sea, the sculpture is eroded with fragments missing. It was retrieved gradually, its discovery made in several stages: the body was brought to light by divers who discovered the wreck of Antikythera in 1901, while his left hand was found in 2016 and his (presumed) head in 2022. The body is 2.50 m. tall and its unattached head is 65 cm, making it a larger-than-life statue.

The sculpture represents Heracles at rest, leaning on his club; it is a Hellenistic copy of the Heracles of Lysippus (dated around 320 BC), of the same type as the Farnese Hercules.

== See also ==
- Antikythera wreck
- Farnese Hercules
- Ancient Greek sculpture
