= Dolphin (weapon) =

Ancient Greek weaponized anchor

A dolphin was an ancient naval weapon carried by Greek galleys. Essentially a weaponized anchor, the dolphin was a shaped heavy weight which would be flung or dropped onto an enemy boat to attempt to breach the hull.

== Use ==
The dolphin was fastened to the end of a pole or yard by a length of chain or cord. This allowed the crew to hurl the dolphin from a height, increasing the force of impact on the enemy ship. Dolphins used by the crew would have been made of stone, but the captain may have had a metal dolphin which was considered sacred and only used in extremis. Common dolphins were lens-shaped, but more elaborate examples were made in recognizable heraldic shapes by casting in metal or by carving in stone and covering in metal. In 8th century BC the need for dolphins was replaced by the invention of the naval ram, but their use continued until at least the 1st century BC on merchant ships not equipped with a ram.

== Antikythera dolphin ==
In 2014, a “war dolphin” — a teardrop-shaped lead weight was discovered in the ongoing exploration of the Antikythera wreck by archeologists from the Hellenic Ministry of Culture and Sports.

== See also ==
- Naval ram
