= Jean Cornu =

French sculptor

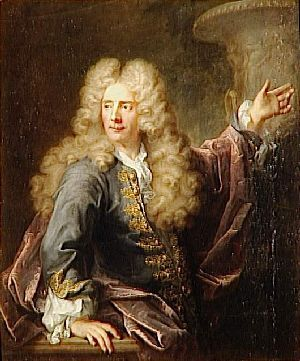
Jean Cornu

Jean Cornu (French pronunciation: [ʒɑ̃ kɔʁny]; 1650, Paris – 1710 / 1715) was a French sculptor, most of whose works were designed for the gardens of the Palace of Versailles.

== Life ==
Cornu's father was from Dieppe, where he sent his son to train in the studio of a sculptor specialising in ivory - none of Cornu's early works in that medium have survived. He regularly worked as a 'sculptor in ordinary' at the court of Louis XIV. In 1673 he won the Grande Prix Colbert, later known as the Prix de Rome. In 1678 he won second prize in sculpture at the French School in Rome.

Colbert, first minister to the king of France, set aside a fund to allow a group of French artists to stay in Rome studying antique sculpture and producing copies of them for the Palace of Versailles. Cornu worked on the decoration of the palace's facades with allegorical figures of music and lyric poetry and mythological figures such as Calliope. He also produced sculptures for the gardens, such as a marble copy of the Farnese Hercules (after a plaster copy brought from Rome) and an allegorical figure of Africa, as well as large ornamental vases with bas-reliefs showing classical mythological scenes (famously photographed early in the 20th century by Eugène Atget). He collaborated with other sculptors and so many of the works at the palace cannot be definitely assigned to a single artist, but are instead attributed to the group of sculptors working for the king. The drawings for the facade sculptures at Versailles were by Charles Le Brun and Cornu and the others worked from these.

He was made a member of the academy on 5 July 1681 and a professor in 1706.

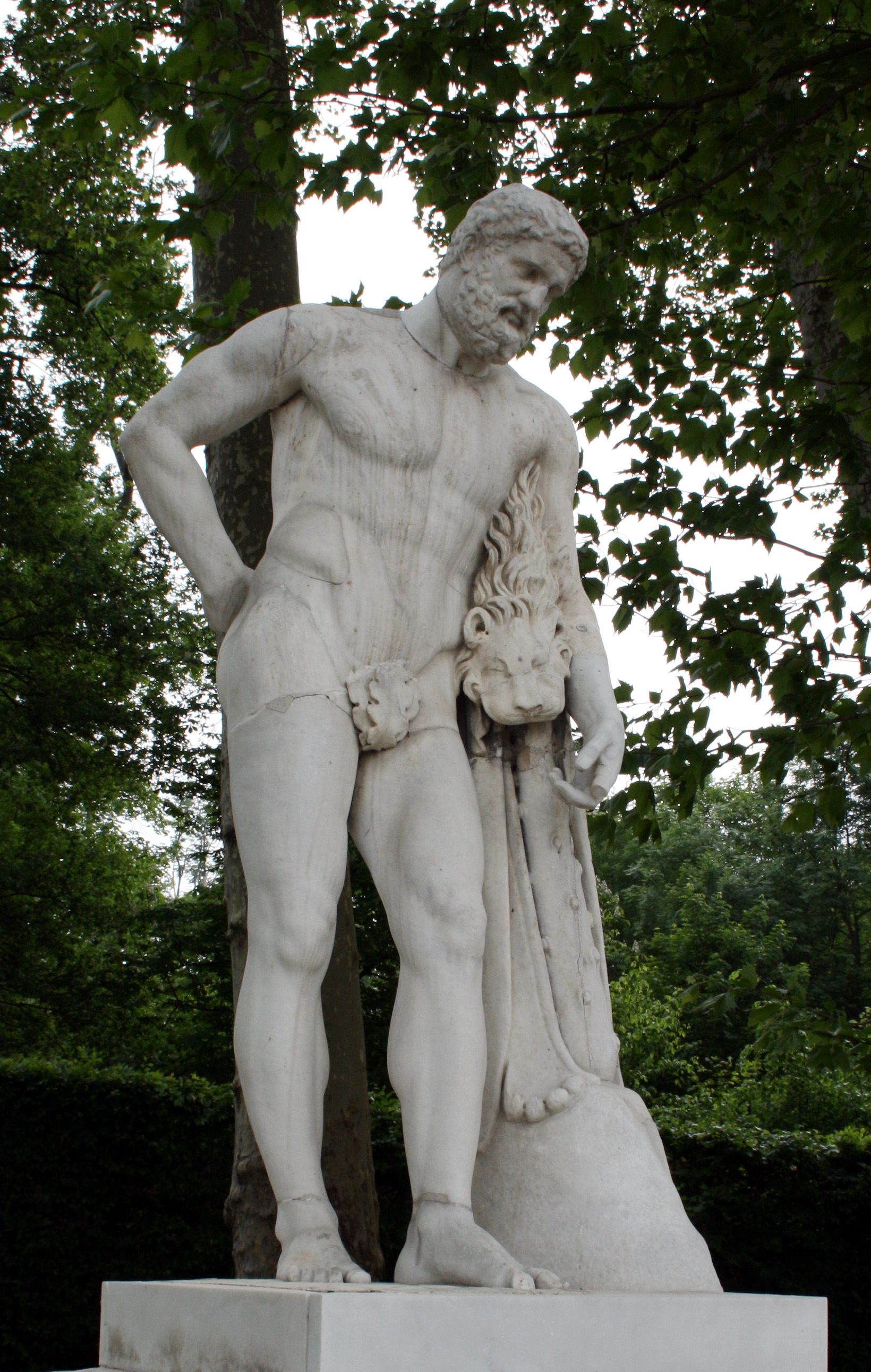
Cornu's Farnese Hercules at the Palace of Versailles.

== Works ==
=== Versailles gardens ===
- Marble vases
- The Sacrifice of Iphigenia (1683), marble, Medici Vase-form with reliefs.. Parterre de Latone, Versailles.
- Bacchus, (1675–1683), marble, Borghese Vase-form. Parterre de Latone, Versailles.
- Two vases with reliefs of oak branches.
- The Hunters, marble group, copied from a classical work
- America (1682), in collaboration with P Picart and Africa (1682–1694), marble, collaboration with Georges Sibrayque. Two marble statues, forming art of the scheme commissioned by Louis XIV for the Parterre d'Eau at Versailles, and is one of the group of four statues known collectively as the four parts of the world
- Copy of the Farnese Hercules (1684–1686) in the King's Garden, marble after a plaster copy brought to Versailles from Rome
- Venus Giving Arms to Aeneas (1704), now in the Metropolitan Museum, New York.

=== Versailles facade ===
- Music and Lyric Poetry
- Calliope, removed from the facade during early 20th-century restoration work and put into storage

== Bibliography ==
- Draper, James David. "Arms for Aeneas: A Group Reattributed to Jean Cornu." Metropolitan Museum Journal, Vol. 24 (1989). Nueva York: Metropolitan Museum of Art. 1989.
- (in French) Jean Baptiste Colbert, Pierre Clément. Lettres, instructions et mémoires de Colbert, published by Imprimerie impériale, 1868
- (in French) Jules LabarteHistoire des arts industriels au moyen âge et à l'époque de la renaissance, published by A. Morel et cie, 1864
- (in French) Karl-Heinrich von Heinecken, Dictionnaire des artistes, dont nous avons des estampes: avec une notice detaillée de leurs ouvrages gravés, published by Breitkopf, 1790.
- (in French) Annie-France Laurens, Krzysztof Pomian, L'Anticomanie: la collection d'antiquités aux 18e et 19e siècles, published by Ecole des hautes études en sciences sociales, 1992
- (in French) Correspondance des directeurs de l'Académie de France à Rome avec les surintendants des bâtiments, Escrito por Accademia di Francia (Rome, Italy), Société de l'histoire de l'art français (France), published by Charavay frères, 1888. Notes under article: v.2 1694–1699
- Jacques Girard, Versailles gardens: sculpture and mythology. Published by Vendome Press, 1985
