= Matthew Darbyshire =

British artist

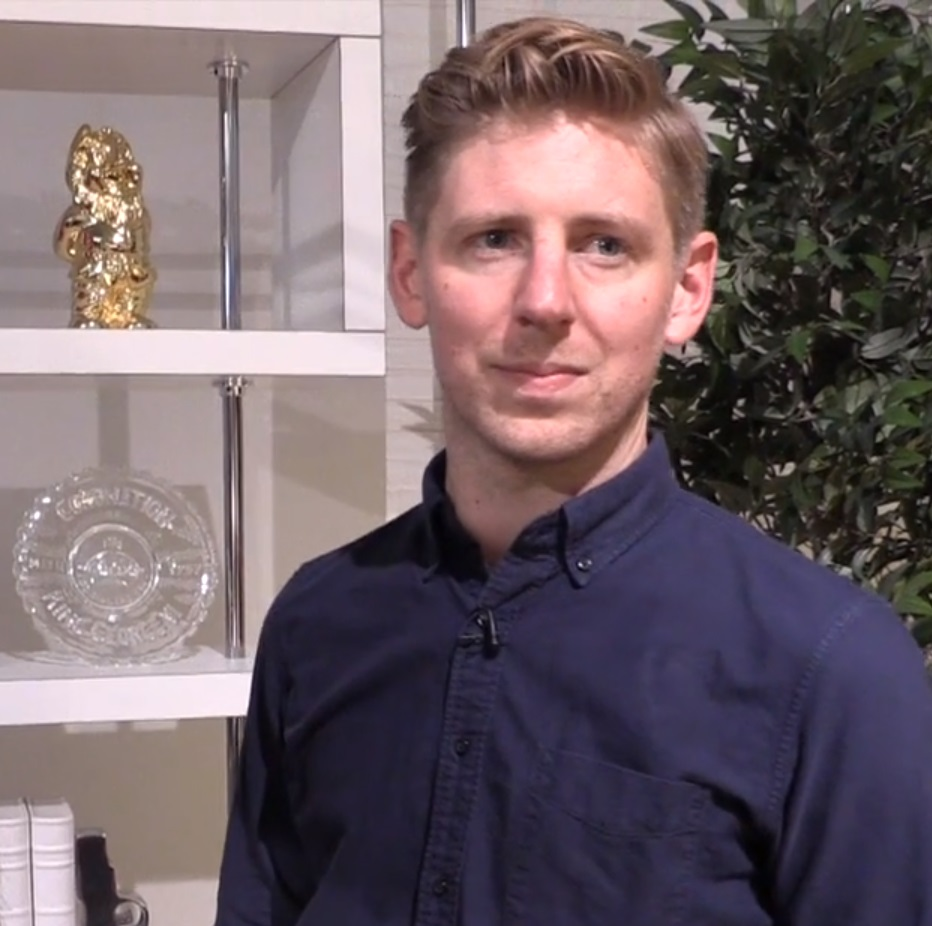
Matthew Darbyshire, An Exhibition for Modern Living, Manchester Art Gallery, 24 Sept 2015

Matthew Darbyshire (born 1977, Cambridge, UK) is a British artist who lives and works in London.

== Background ==
Darbyshire was born in Cambridge, UK, in 1977. He completed his BA in Fine Art at the Slade School of Fine Art, London, before going on to complete his Post-Graduate Diploma at Royal Academy Schools, graduating in 2005. Darbyshire has held teaching positions at the Slade School of Fine Art, London, Anglia Ruskin University, Cambridge, Open School East, London/Margate, Goldsmiths, Royal Academy Schools, London and Dirty Art Dept, Amsterdam.

== Exhibitions ==
Darbyshire's work has been exhibited at the Hayward Gallery, Manchester Art Gallery, Krolikarnia National Museum, Warsaw, The Hepworth, Wakefield, Tramway, Glasgow, Whitechapel Gallery, the Royal Academy of Arts. His work is in the public collections of Arts Council Collection, UK Government Art Collection, UK, Artist Pension Trust, New York, US, Deutsche Bank, Frankfurt, DE, Centre National des arts Plastiques, Paris, FR, The Hepworth, Wakefield, UK. Public commissions are on display at 11 Rue Simon-Crubellier, Olympic Stadionplein, Amsterdam, NL and Sculpture Garden, Battersea in London.

== Works ==
In 2014 Darbyshire created the polystyrene sculpture Hercules, which is an imitation of the Farnese Hercules. The deliberate choice of a white material has been interpreted as a perpetuation of colourism in how we view and understand classical sculpture.
