= Antikythera wreck =

Roman-era shipwreck

Coordinates: 35.8897°N 23.3078°E

The Antikythera wreck lies off the Greek island of Antikythera on the edge of the Aegean Sea, northwest of Crete

The Antikythera wreck (Greek: ναυάγιο των Αντικυθήρων, romanized: navágio ton Antikythíron) is a Roman-era shipwreck dating from the second quarter of the first century BC.

It was discovered by sponge divers off Point Glyphadia on the Greek island of Antikythera in 1900.

The wreck yielded numerous statues, coins, and other artifacts dating back to the fourth century BC, as well as the severely corroded remnants of a device many regard as the world's oldest known analog computer, the Antikythera mechanism. These ancient artifacts, works of art, and elements of the ship are now on display at the National Archaeological Museum of Athens.

== Discovery ==
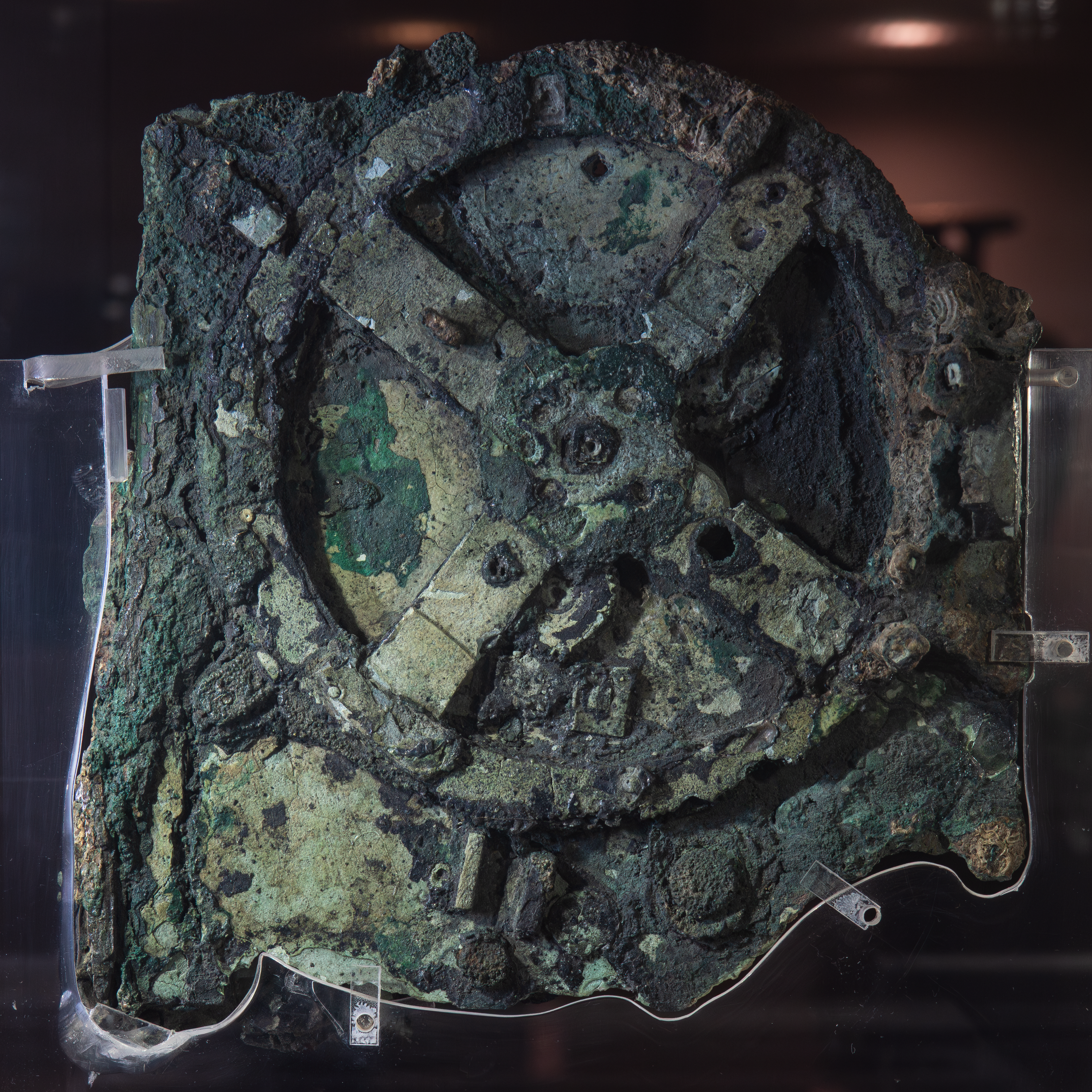
The Antikythera mechanism (Fragment A – front)

Around Easter 1900, Captain Dimitrios Kondos and his crew of sponge divers from Symi sailed through the Aegean en route to fishing grounds off North Africa. They stopped at the Greek island of Antikythera to wait for favorable winds. During the layover, they began diving off the island's coast wearing the standard diving dress of the time – waterproofed canvas suits and copper helmets.

Diver Elias Stadiatis descended to 45 meters (148 ft) depth, then quickly signaled to be pulled to the surface. He described a heap of rotting corpses and horses strewn among the rocks on the seafloor. Thinking the diver was drunk from the nitrogen in his breathing air at that depth, Kondos donned diving gear and descended to the site. He soon returned to the surface with the arm of a bronze statue. Shortly thereafter, the men departed as planned to fish for sponges, but at the end of the season they returned to Antikythera and retrieved several artifacts from the wreck. Kondos reported the finds to authorities in Athens, and Hellenic Navy vessels were quickly sent to support the salvage effort from November 1900 through 1901.

== Artifact recovery ==
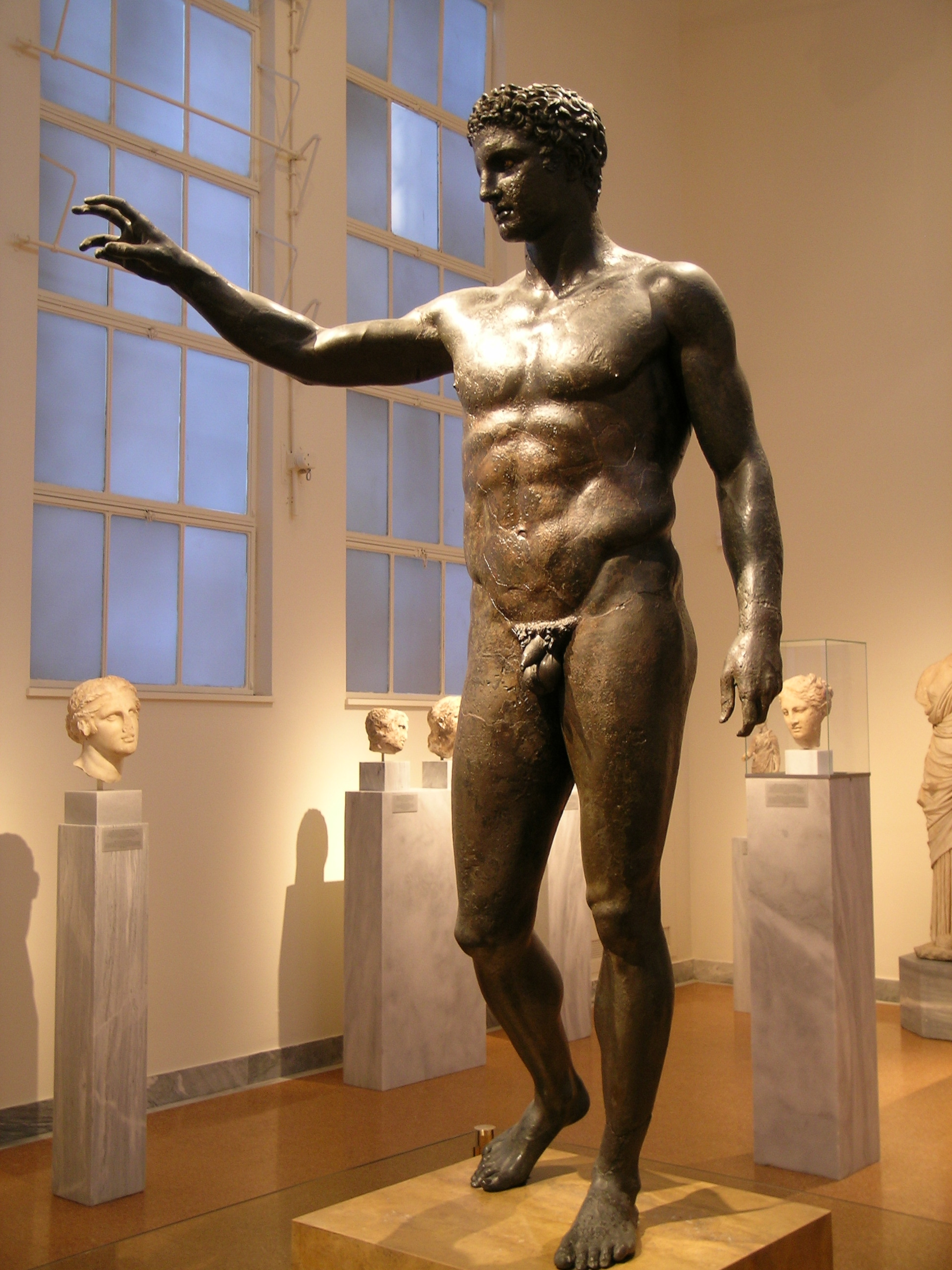
The Antikythera Youth or Ephebe

Together with the Greek Education Ministry and the Royal Hellenic Navy, the sponge divers salvaged numerous artifacts. By the middle of 1901, divers had recovered bronze statues, one named "The Philosopher", the Youth of Antikythera (Ephebe) of c. 340 BC, and thirty-six marble sculptures including Hercules, Odysseus, Diomedes, Hermes, Apollo, three marble statues of horses (a fourth was dropped during recovery and was lost on the sea floor), a bronze lyre, and several pieces of glasswork. Recovered ship's equipment included lead scupper pipes and hull sheeting, and a set of sounding leads weighing 6 and 14 kg (13 and 31 lb). These are the only sounding weights ever discovered on an ancient shipwreck in the Aegean, although comparable examples have been recovered along the Levantine coast. Many other small and common artifacts also were found, and the entire assemblage was taken to the National Archaeological Museum in Athens. The death of diver Giorgos Kritikos and the paralysis of two others due to decompression sickness put an end to work at the site during the summer of 1901.

On 17 May 1902, archaeologist Valerios Stais made the most celebrated find while studying the artefacts at the National Archaeological Museum. He noticed that a severely corroded piece of bronze had a gear wheel embedded in it and legible inscriptions in Greek. The object would come to be known as the Antikythera mechanism. Originally thought to be one of the first forms of a mechanised clock or an astrolabe, it is at times referred to as the world’s oldest known analog computer.

The wreck remained untouched until 1953, when French naval officer and explorer Jacques Cousteau briefly visited to relocate the site. Cousteau returned with a full team in the summer and autumn of 1976 at the invitation of the Greek government. Under the direction of archaeologist Lazaros Kolonas, the team recovered nearly 300 artifacts, including four hull planks, ceramic jars, bronze and silver coins, which helped dating the wreck more accurately, pieces of bronze and marble sculptures, bronze statuettes, several pieces of gold jewelry, and even human remains of the crew and passengers.

A five-year comprehensive survey program which began in 2021 recovered additional artifacts, including the head of a marble statue, possibly the missing head of a statue of Hercules recovered from the same site in 1902.

== Dating ==
Although the retrieval of artifacts from the shipwreck was highly successful and accomplished within two years, dating the site proved difficult and took much longer. Based on related works with known provenances, the bronze statues could be dated back to the fourth century BC. It was suggested that the marble statues, however, were Hellenistic-era copies of earlier works.

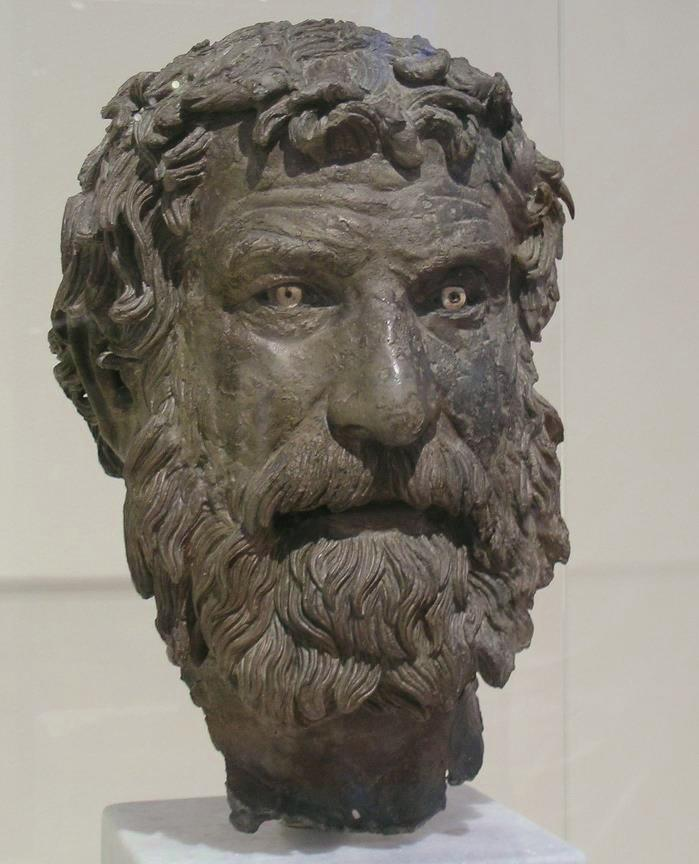
The bronze head of a philosopher recovered from the Antikythera shipwreck in 1901, part of a life-sized statue of the man.

Some scholars speculated that the ship was carrying part of the loot of the Roman General Sulla from Athens in 86 BC, and might have been on its way to Italy. A reference by the Greek writer, Lucian, to one of Sulla's ships sinking in the Antikythera region gave rise to this theory. Supporting an early first-century BC date were domestic utensils and objects from the ship, similar to those known from other first-century BC contexts. The amphorae recovered from the wreck indicated a date of 80–70 BC, the Hellenistic pottery a date of 75–50 BC, and the Roman ceramics were similar to known mid-first century types. Any possible association with Sulla was eliminated, however, when the coins discovered in the 1970s during work by Jacques Cousteau and associates were found to have been minted between 76 and 67 BC. Nevertheless, it is possible that the sunken cargo ship was en route to Rome or elsewhere in Italy with looted treasures to support a triumphal parade. Alternatively, perhaps the cargo was assembled on commission from a wealthy Roman patron.

Remains of hull planks showed that the ship was made of elm, a wood often used by the Romans in their ships. Eventually, in 1964, a sample of the hull planking was carbon dated, and delivered a calibrated calendar date of 220 BC ± 43 years. The disparity in the calibrated radiocarbon date and the expected date based on the ceramics and coins was explained by presuming that the sample plank originated from an old tree, cut much earlier than the ship's sinking event.

Further evidence for an early first-century BC sinking date came in 1974, when Yale University Professor Derek de Solla Price published his interpretation of the Antikythera mechanism. He argued that the object was a calendar computer. From gear settings and inscriptions on the mechanism's faces, he concluded that the mechanism was made about 87 BC and lost only a few years afterward.

== 21st-century expeditions ==
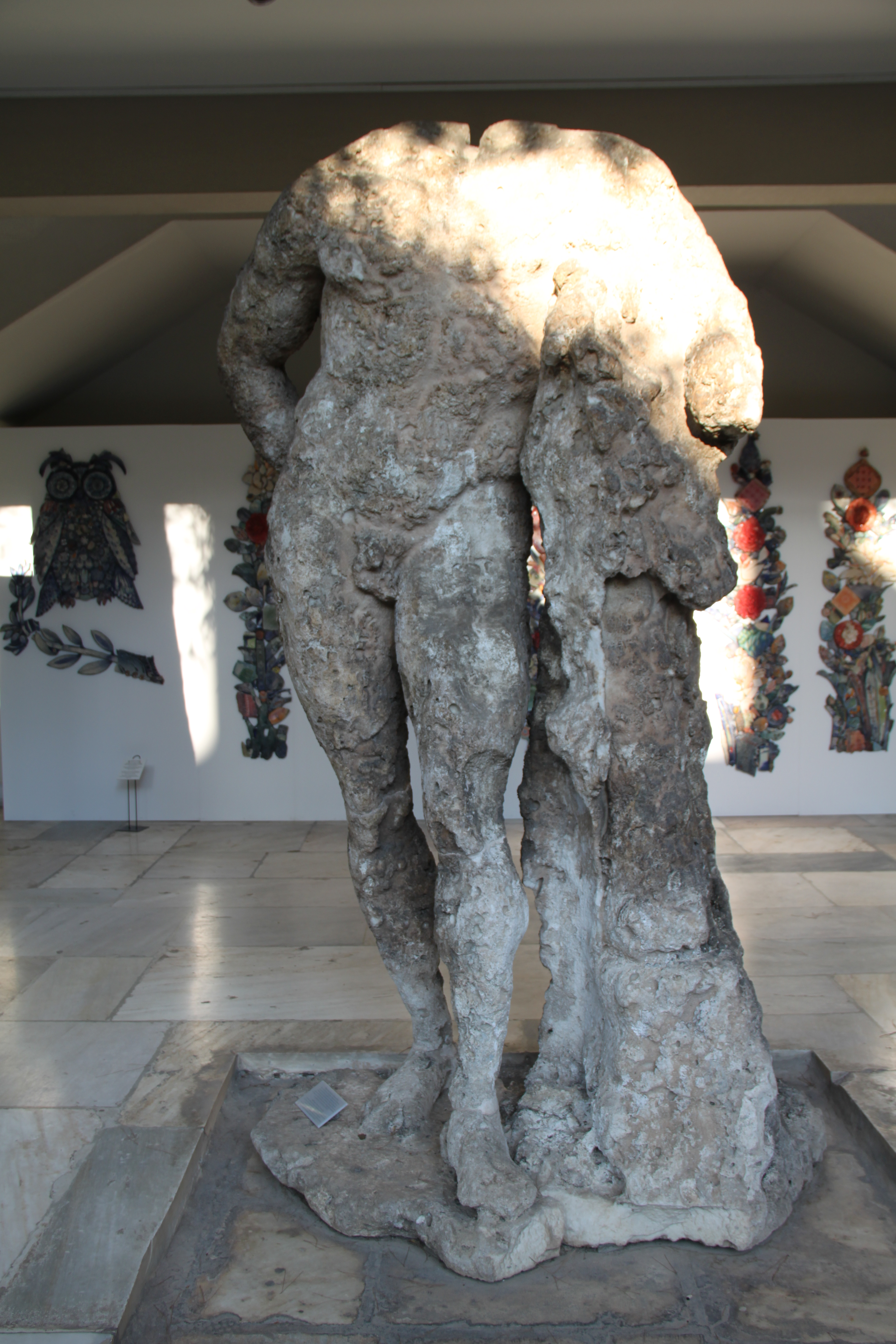
Heracles of Antikythera.

In 2012, marine archeologist Brendan P. Foley (formerly of the Woods Hole Oceanographic Institution in the United States and since 2017 at Lund University, Sweden) received permission from the Greek government to conduct new dives around the entire island of Antikythera. With project co-director Dr. Theotokis Theodoulou, the divers began a preliminary three-week survey in October 2012 using rebreather technology, to allow for extended dives down to a depth of 70 meters (230 ft), for a fuller, complete survey of the site. The team completed an underwater circumnavigation of the island, documented several isolated finds, relocated the Antikythera Wreck, and identified a second ancient shipwreck a few hundred meters south of the Antikythera Wreck.

The Hellenic Ephorate of Underwater Antiquities (EUA) has continued investigations at Antikythera. In 2014 and 2015 it conducted robotic mapping surveys over the two ancient wreck sites, cooperating with the Woods Hole Oceanographic Institution and the Australian Centre for Field Robotics of the University of Sydney. Subsequent excavations of the Antikythera Wreck in 2014–2016 delivered new finds from the ship: wood elements from the hull or decks, components of two anchors made of lead, an enormous lead salvage ring, lead hull sheeting, several bronze nails and spikes, and a bronze rigging ring. The wreck also relinquished many luxury goods, including two large bronze spears from statues, the left hand of a marble statue, ornate glass bowls, intact ceramic jars of several different styles, and a gold ring very similar to one recovered in 1976. One extraordinary find is an ancient weapon known as a dolphin, a 100-kilogram (220 lb) lead bulb tipped with an iron spike, intended to be dropped from the ship’s yardarm through the deck and hull of an attacking vessel. This is the only example of a war dolphin ever discovered. On 31 August 2016, a 2000-year old human skeleton nicknamed Pamphilos was discovered at the shipwreck.

The EUA excavation continued in September–October 2017 and in October 2019, and resulted in the recovery of a bronze arm from a sculpture, together with other fragments of bronze and marble statues. Organic finds included more human skeletal remains, and a large section of articulated hull planking and frames from the ship. The team also recovered a finely-formed red marble object that may be a sarcophagus lid, and a mysterious bronze disk depicting a bull.

In 2022 three 8.5-ton boulders that had partially covered the wreck were removed, permitting further discoveries. Human teeth were found, opening the possibility of genetic and isotopic analysis to provide information on the people who sailed the ship. Archaeologist Lorenz Baumer, overseeing the 2022 mission with the University of Geneva, described the Antikythera wreck as "an extremely rich site, the richest in the ancient world".

== See also ==
- Out-of-place artifact
