= Group of Aphrodite, Pan and Eros =

Statue group of Aphrodite and Pan

- Greek: Αφροδίτη, Παν και Έρως
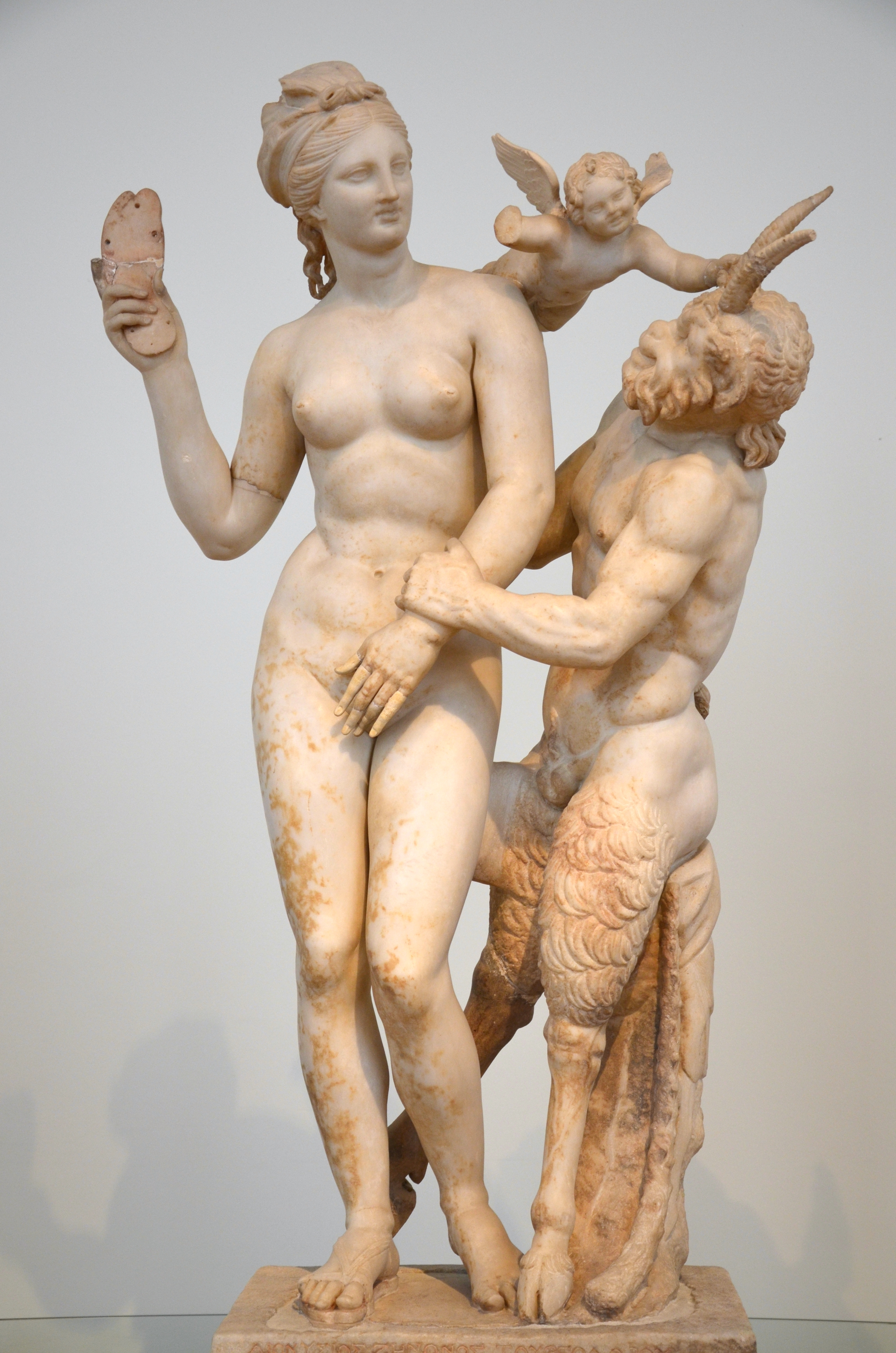
- The statue in the NAMA
- Type: Statue
- Material: Parian marble
- Height: 155 cm
- Writing: Greek
- Created: c. 100 BC
- Discovered: 1904; Delos
- Present location: National Archaeological Museum, Athens, Greece
- Classification: Hellenistic
- Identification: No 3335
- Culture: Greek
- www.namuseum.gr

The Group of Aphrodite, Pan and Eros (Greek: Αφροδίτη, Παν και Έρως) is an ancient marble Greek sculpture of the first century BC depicting the goat-legged god Pan attempting to woo Aphrodite, the goddess of love and desire, unsuccessfully as she and her son Eros try to repel him. It was found on the Aegean island of Delos in the early twentieth century, and is now housed in the National Archaeological Museum of Athens with inventory number 3335.

== History ==
The statue was made around 100 BC, by a man named Dionysius, according to the inscription:

Διονύσιος Ζήνωνος τοῦ Θεοδώρου
Βηρύτιος, εὐεργέτης, ὐπὲρ ἑαυτοῦ
καὶ τῶν τέκνων, θεοῖς πατρίοις.

Translation:

Dionysius from Berytos, son of Zeno son of Theodoros,
[donates the statue] as a benefactor to the ancestral gods
for himself and his children.

The marble group was discovered on the island of Delos in 1904, in a room of the Hall of the Guild of the Poseidoniasts (the worshippers of the sea-god Poseidon) from Beirut in modern-day Lebanon. According to the inscription found above the west columns, the members of this club were tradesmen, shipowners and warehousemen.

Today it is kept in Room 30 of the NAMA.

== Description ==
The group statue is made of Parian marble, and at 1.55 m. tall (including the large base), it is slightly smaller than lifesize.

Aphrodite, the beautiful naked goddess of beauty and love, is depicted in frontal with hair well-tressed and tied up with a scarf bound in a bow above her parting. She has entirely stripped down, possibly preparing for a bath, with the exception of a sandal still in her right foot. She places her weight on her right leg, while the manner in which she bends her left, relaxed leg lends a gracefulness to her stance. She uses her left hand to cover up her pubic triangle, in an attempt to protect it with her palm from the amorous advances of the horned, goat-legged Pan, depicted in profile, who in turn has seized her left wrist with his own left hand, trying to yank it away and pull her closer to him. Pan's muscular body and prominent veins, particularly seen on his left arm, also illustrate the animalistic nature of the god, as he tries to get Aphrodite to engage in sexual acts with him, which she rejects.

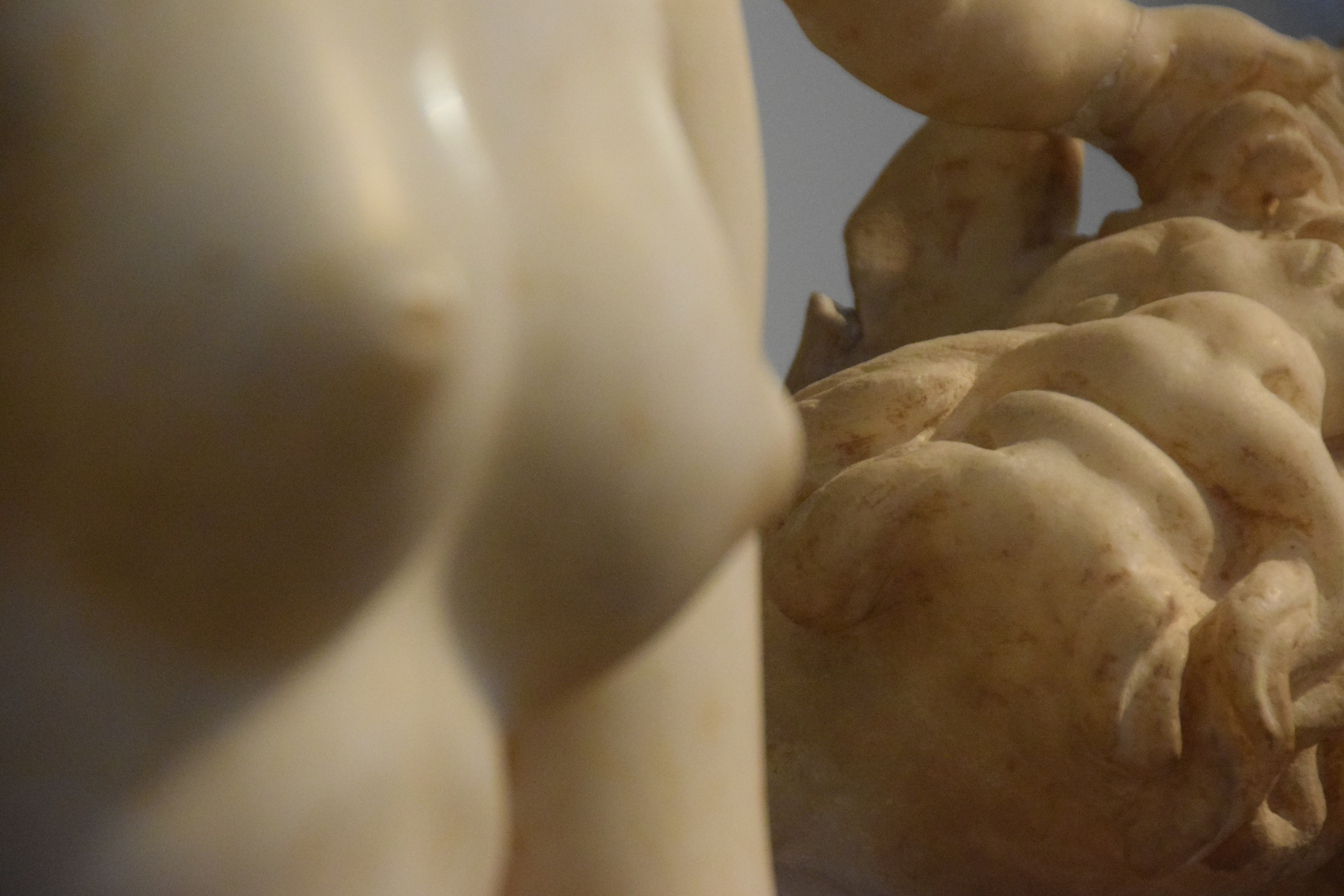
Close-up in Pan's face.

With her other hand, Aphrodite has brandished her sandal (leaving her left foot bare) as she tries to deter him. Aphrodite's winged little son Eros, the god of romantic love, is similarly trying to assist his mother fight off her assaulter by grasping Pan's right horn and pushing him away. Pan leans on a tree trunk (the statue's marble support) covered with animal's skin, and has left his hunting stick at the foot of the trunk. He has two long and pointed horns, his face is covered with fur and his furry legs end in goat's hooves. His is connected to the marble support via his left leg up to the buttocks.

The statue combines the heroic nudity, represented by the goddess, and the contrasting wild, animalistic, Dionysian nudity that Pan embodies. It has been described as a "characteristic example of Hellenistic rococo."

The right arm of the goddess and the upper part of the head, as well as the legs and the left arm of Eros, had to be reattached as they were broken off. Eros's right arm is missing. Pan's right leg and horns also had to be reattached. Three fingers of Aphrodite's left hand and the middle finger of her right hand were supplemented with plaster.

== Gallery ==
Aphrodite, Pan and Eros

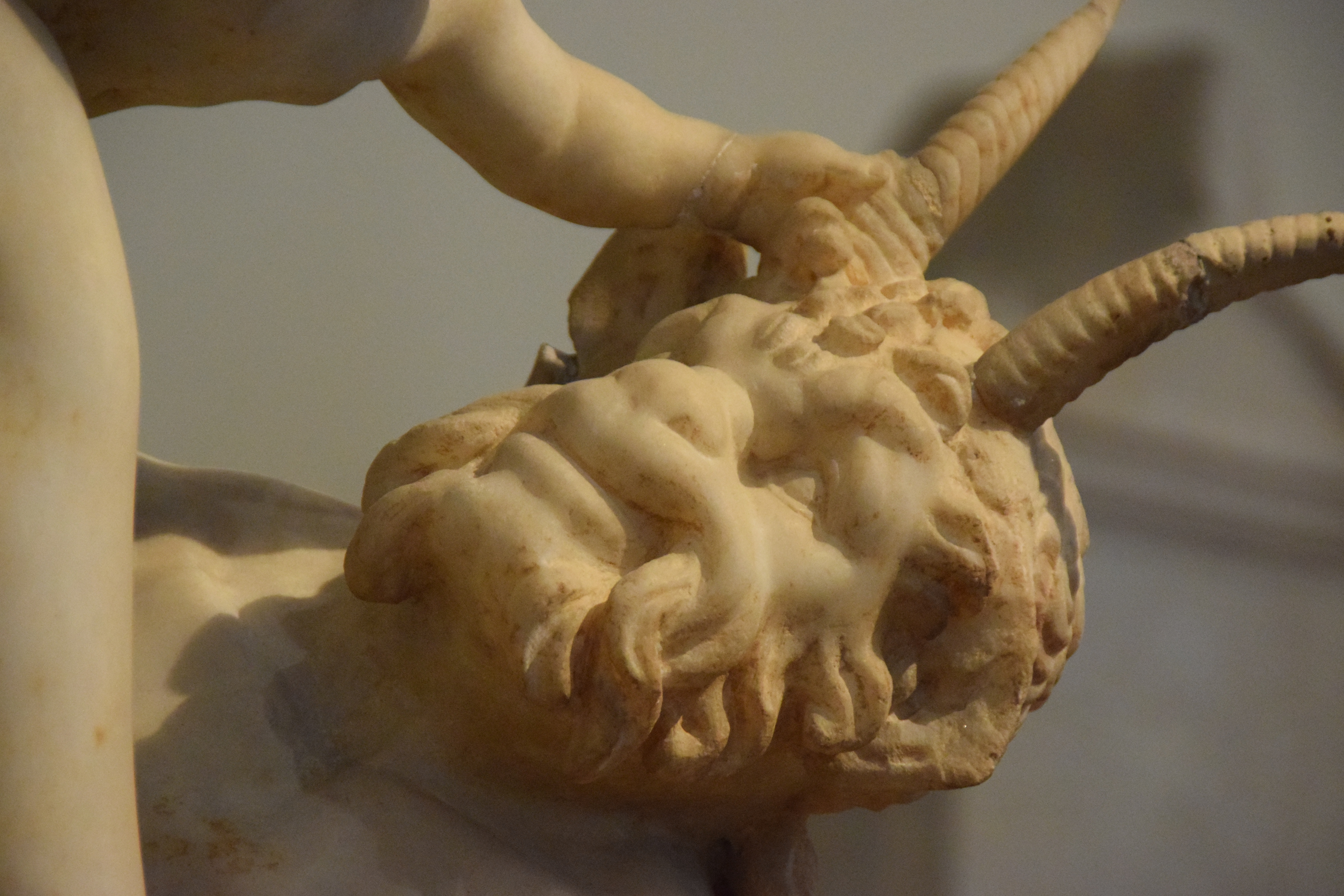
Pan's face.

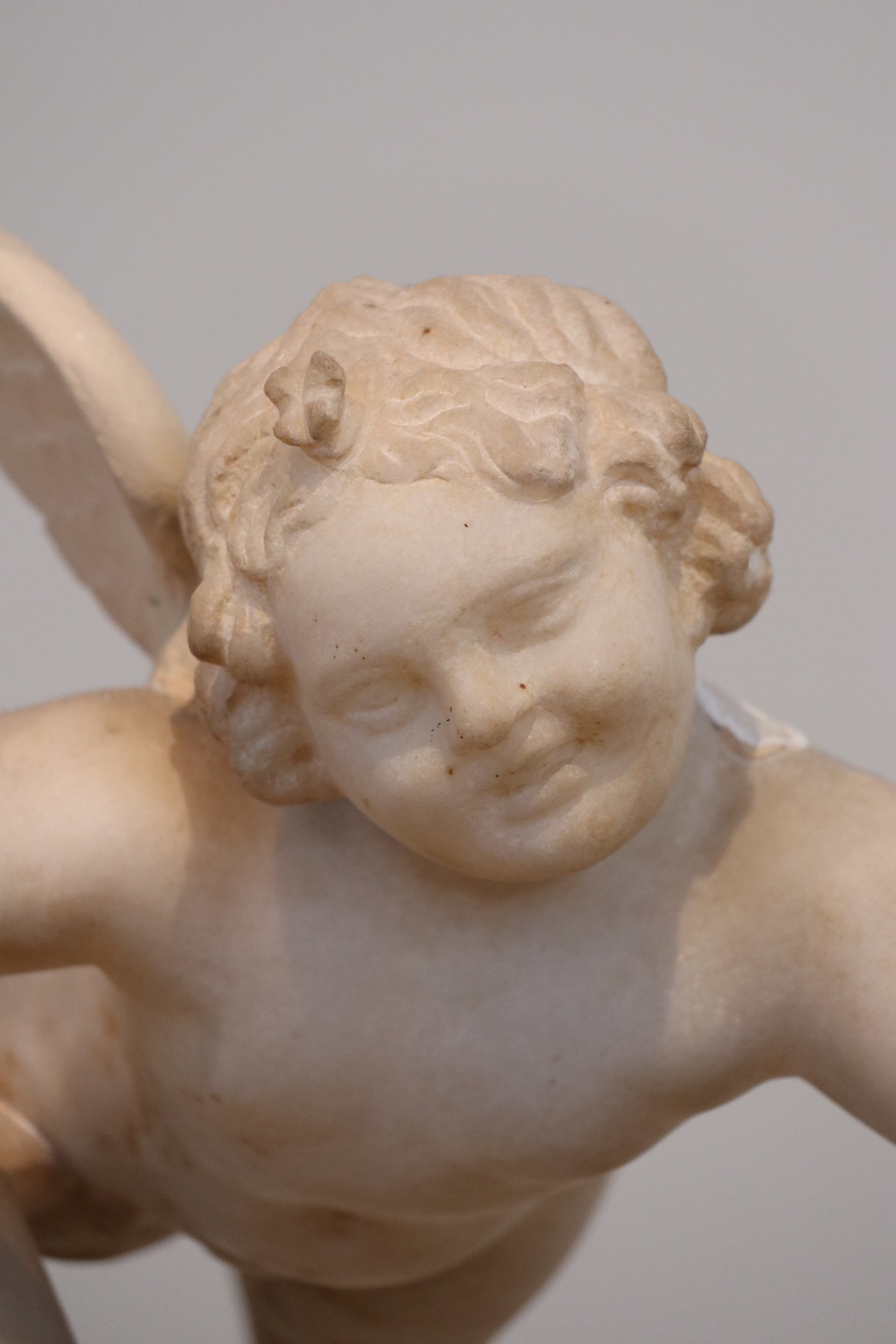
Cheerful Eros.

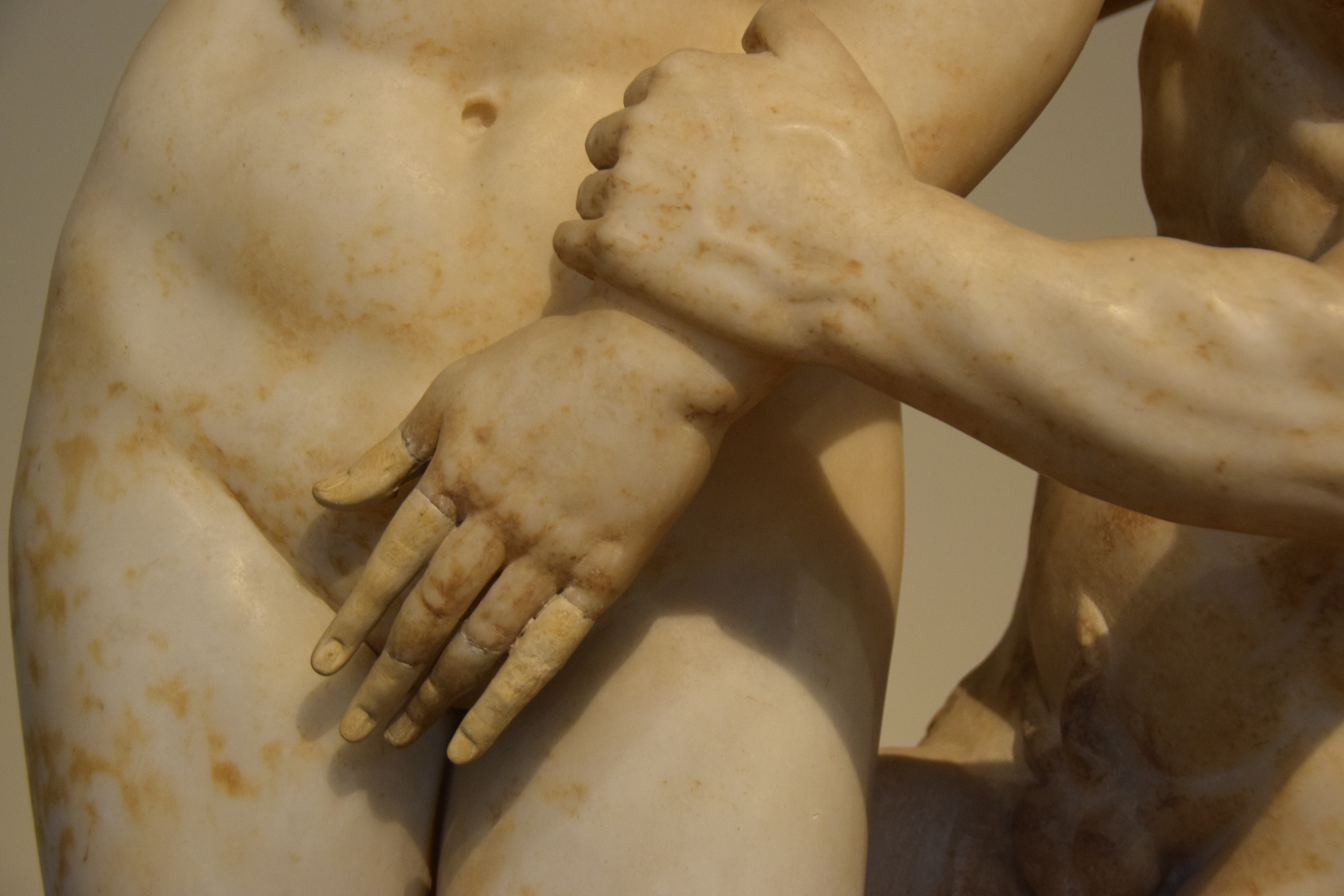
Aphrodite tries to cover herself.

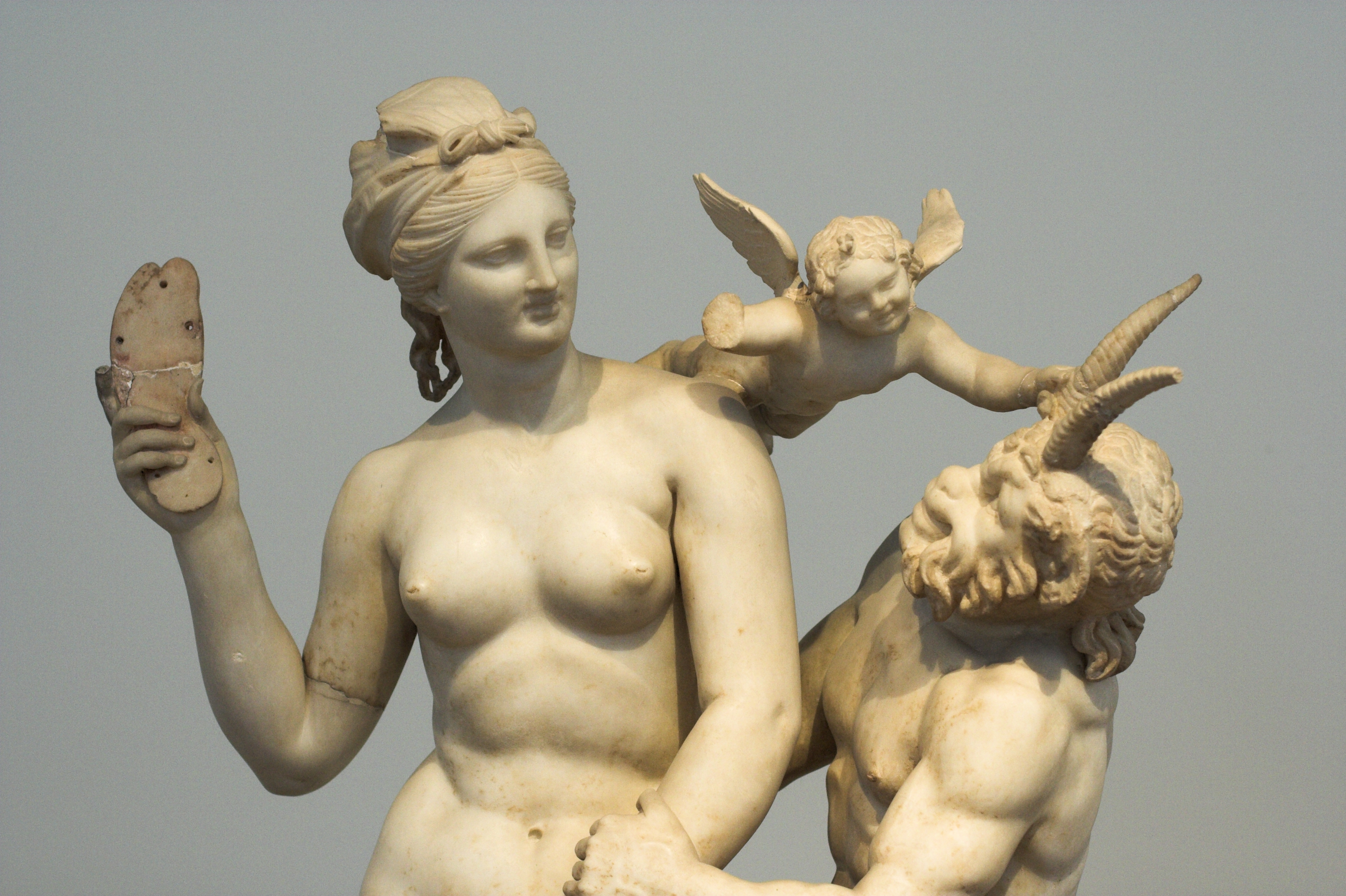
Upper torsos.

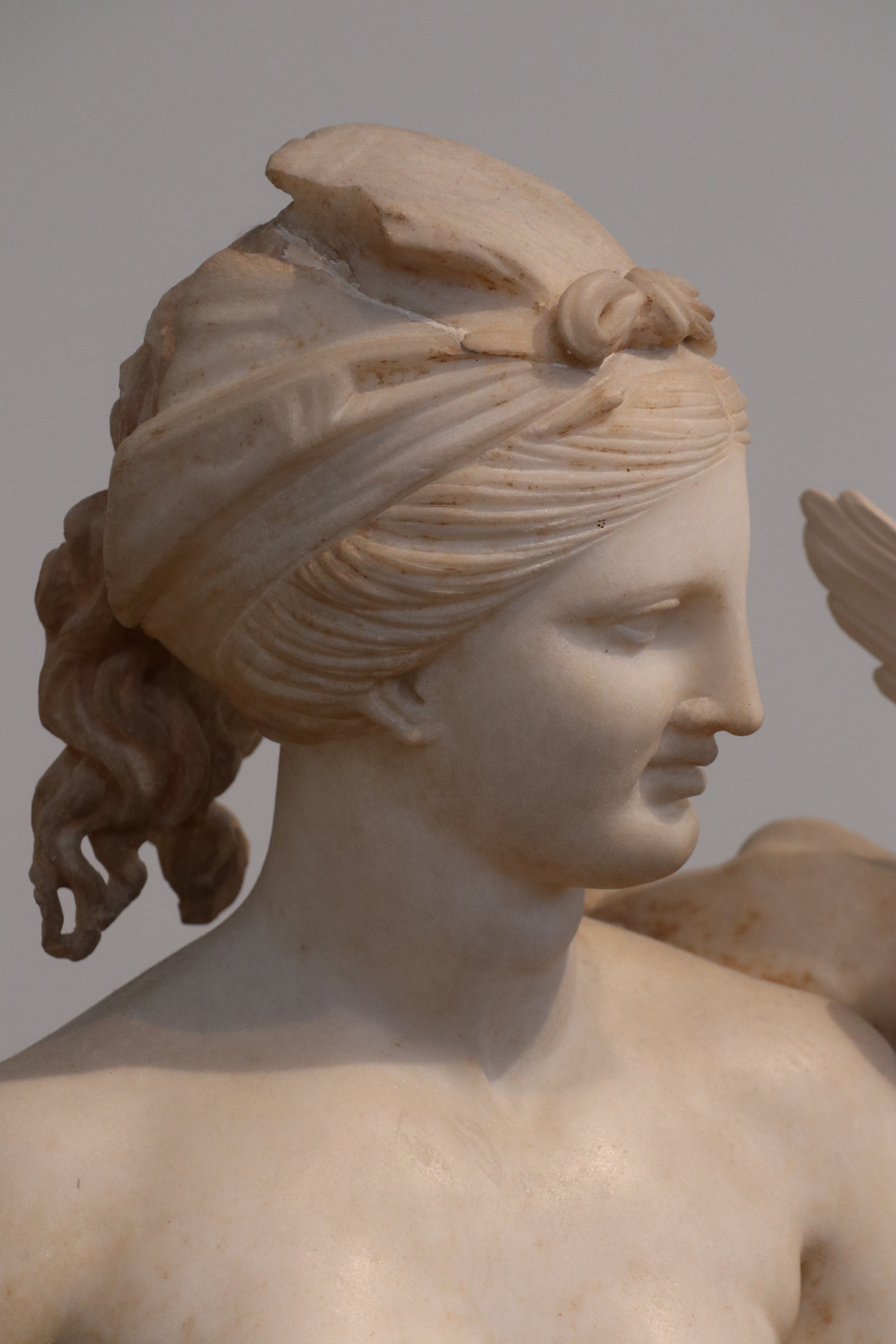
Head of Aphrodite.

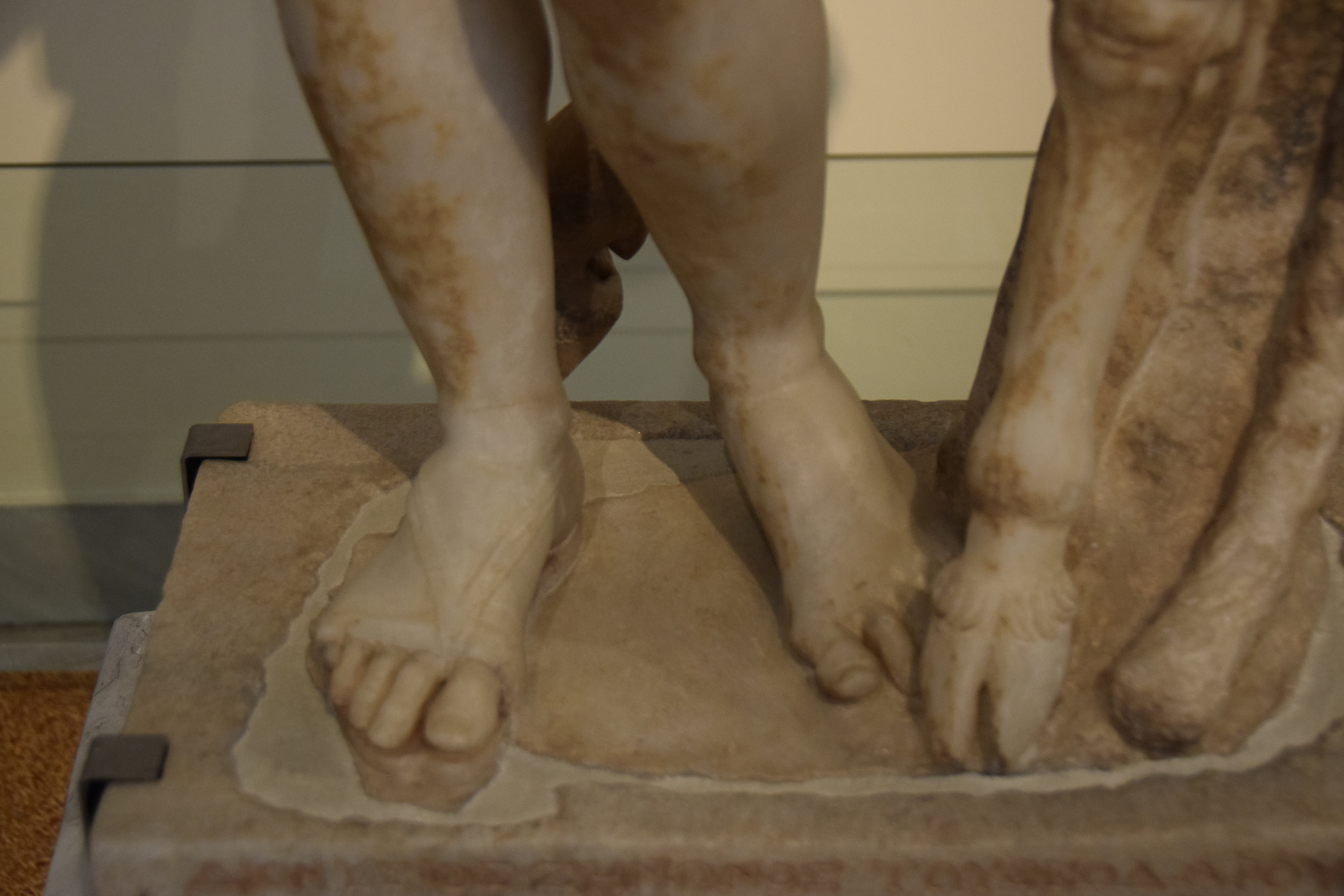
Legs and base.

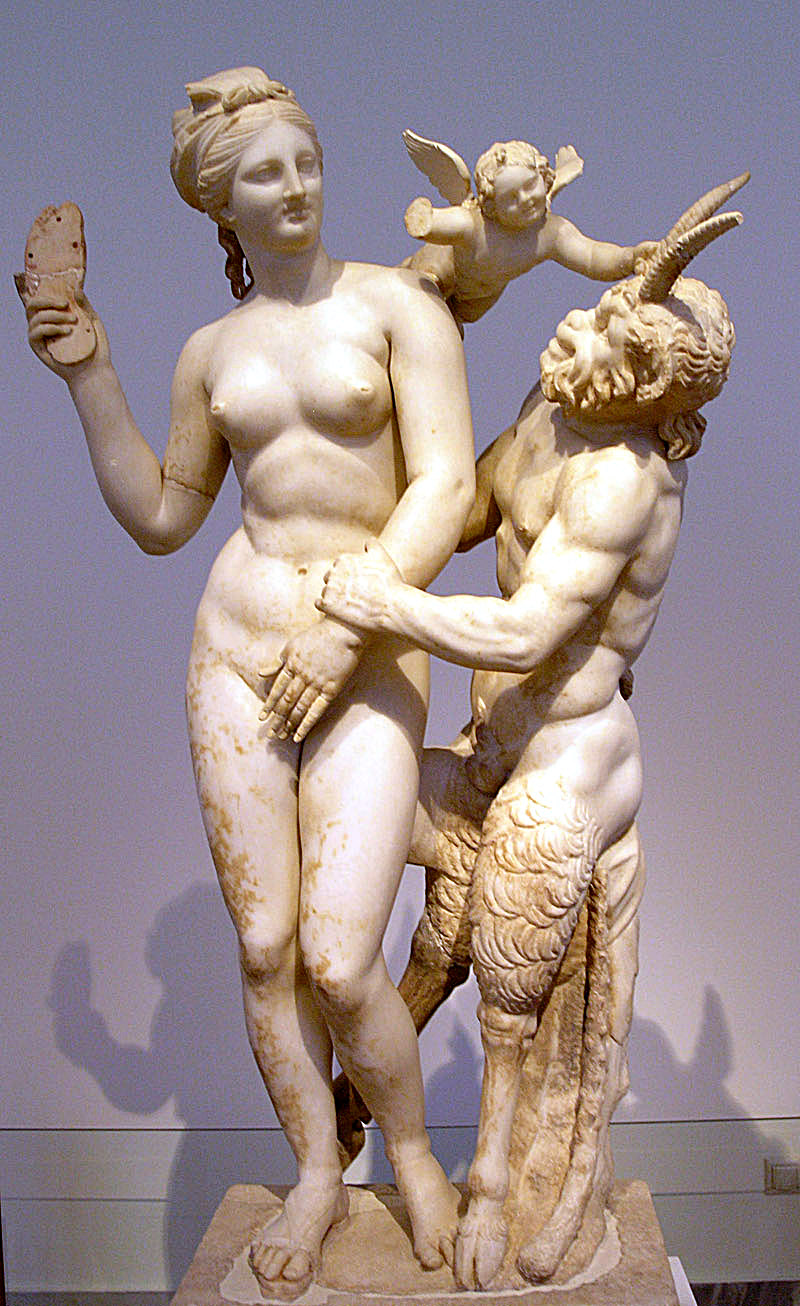

== See also ==
- Armed Aphrodite
- Aphrodite of Syracuse
- Aphrodite Hypolympidia
- Aphrodite of Rhodes

== Bibliography ==
- Kaltsas, Nikolaos (2002). Sculpture in the National Archaeological Museum, Athens. Los Angeles, US: The J. Paul Getty Museum. ISBN 0-89236-686-9.
- Kaltsas, Nikolaos (2007). Εθνικό Αρχαιολογικό Μουσείο [National Archaeological Museum] (PDF) (in Greek). Athens, Greece: OLKOS. ISBN 978-960-89339-1-0.
