= Aphrodite Rhithymnia =

Statue of Aphrodite in Crete, Greece

Aphrodite of Rhithymna
- Αφροδίτη Ριθυμνία (Greek)
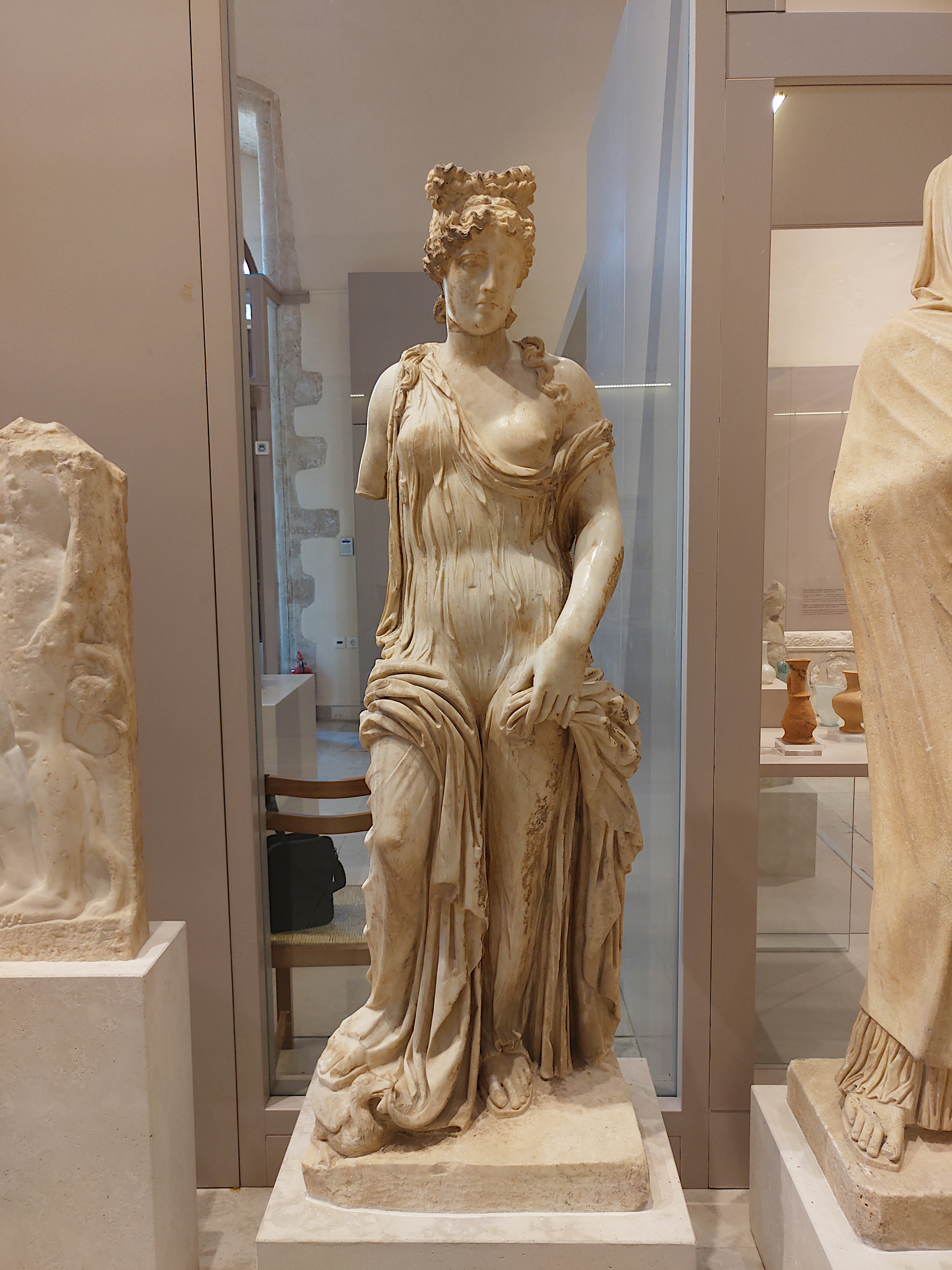
- The statue in the Archaeological Museum of Rethymno in 2020
- Year: 1st century AD
- Catalogue: Λ 181
- Medium: Marble
- Movement: Roman
- Subject: Aphrodite
- Dimensions: 160 cm (63 in)
- Condition: Almost intact, right forearm missing
- Location: Archaeological Museum of Rethymno, Rethymno, Crete
- Owner: Greece

The Aphrodite Rhithymnia (Ancient Greek: Ἀφροδίτη Ῥιθυμνία, romanized: Aphrodítē Rhithumnía, lit. 'Aphrodite of Rhithymna'), also known as Aphrodite of Lappa (Greek: Αφροδίτη της Λάππας), is a Roman statue of the first century AD found at the site of ancient Lappa, in modern-day Argyroupoli, western Crete, Greece. The marble statue is life-size and depicts Aphrodite, the Greek goddess of love and sensuality, and copies an earlier lost Greek sculptural type. It is now exhibited in the Archaeological Museum of Rethymno in Rethymno town, known in antiquity as Rhithymna.

== History ==
=== Creation ===
The statue was created around the second half of the first century AD, during the Roman period of the island, in the ancient city of Lappa, which lies on the site of modern Argyroupoli.

=== Discovery ===
The sculpture was discovered during the time when talks were taking place by the municipality of Rethymno about acquiring the rampart of the town's fortress and converting it into an archaeological museum, when a resident informed the local archaeological ephorate of the existence of an ancient statue buried deep somewhere in a local man's estate. According to him, the owner of the land had discovered it previously when he attempted to build a well, but re-buried it again and covered it with soil. The man in question was contacted, and excavations in the plot started soon after relevant permissions were signed, although initially with no success. On the eighth day of digging, a marble statue was unearthed, missing its head and the greater part of the right arm. It took another five or six days for the head to be located nearby; the missing arm was never recovered.

The statue was then moved to the regional capital town of Rethymno, and in time it became a prominent exhibit of the Archaeological Museum of Rethymno (housed in a former Catholic church dedicated to Saint Francis) with inventory number Λ 181. The owner of the plot of land in which the sculpture was found was eventually awarded 1500 drachmas.

== Description ==
The statue is made of white marble, and with a height of 160 centimetres (63 in) it is life-sized. The statue is well preserved, with only its right arm below the elbow missing. The head, which had been previously broken off, has been reattached to the neck.

Aphrodite stands on a low rectangular base, her left leg firm and supporting her weight while the right leg is relaxed and loosely bent, a posture common in statues known as contrapposto. Her right foot is stepping on the back of a duck, which turns around to bite her long chiton. Aphrodite's garment appears almost transparent, as if it is wet, and outlines her body. It then slips casually off the goddess's left shoulder, exposing her left breast. Her hair is richly tressed in an "Apollo's knot", while long curls fall elegantly over her shoulders, thus accentuating her serene and beautiful face. Both of her arms are hanging low, and the left hand holds a fold of the mantle in front of her thigh.

This Roman sculpture is a copy of an original Greek type, now lost. The copy seems to have adapted only the drapery of the original; the head is similar to that of the Venus de' Medici. The resemblance to the Venus Genetrix type has also been noted.

== See also ==
- Victoria Romana
- Aphrodite Hypolympidia
- Aphrodite of Syracuse
- Aphrodite Heyl
- Roman sculpture

== Bibliography ==
- Schmidt, Evamaria (1997). "Venus". Lexicon Iconographicum Mythologiae Classicae (LIMC). Vol. VIII.1: Thespiades – Zodiacus. Zürich and Munich: Artemis Verlag. ISBN 3760887589. Internet Archive.
