= Armed Aphrodite =

Sculpture of Aphrodite Areia

- Ένοπλη Αφροδίτη (Greek)
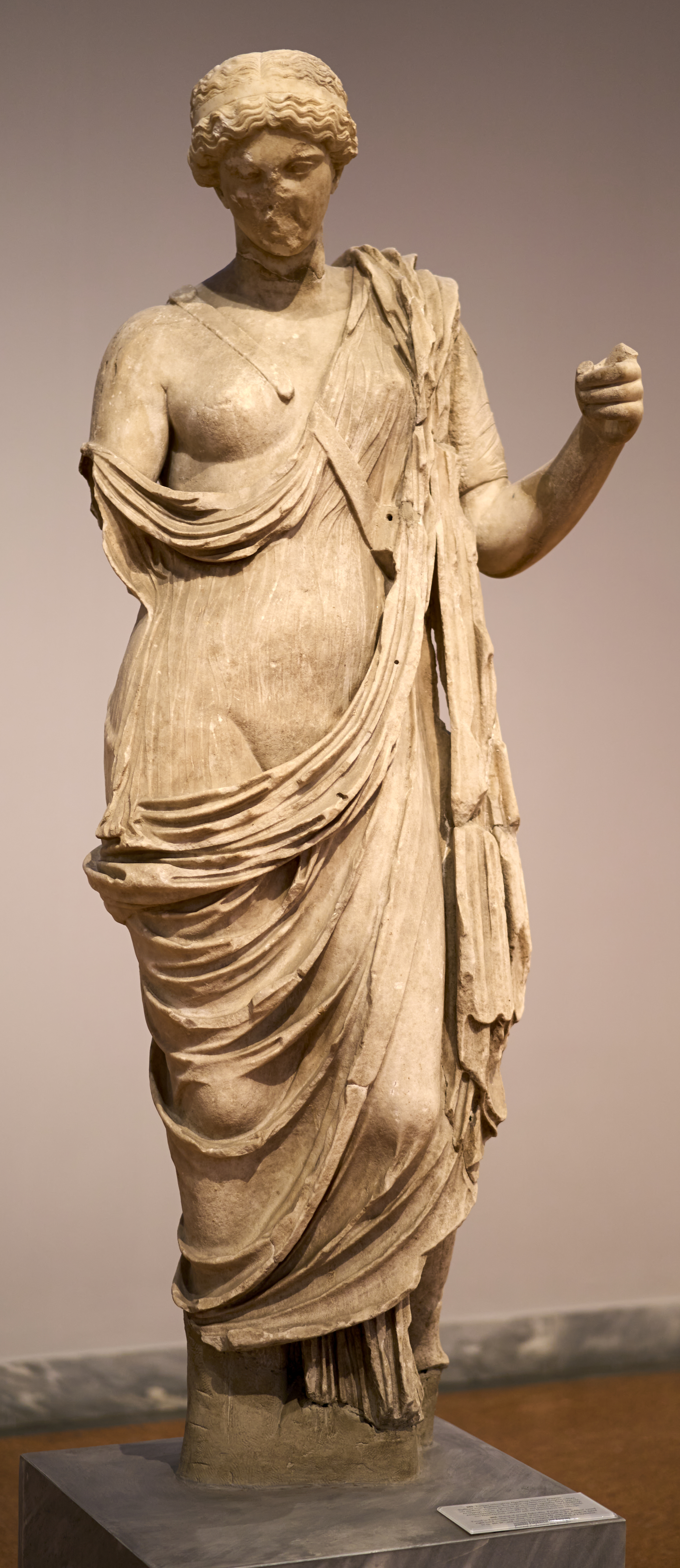
- The statue today in the NAMA
- Year: 1st century AD
- Catalogue: No 262
- Medium: Marble
- Movement: Classical
- Subject: the goddess Aphrodite
- Dimensions: 1.51 m (59 in)
- Condition: Intact
- Location: National Archaeological Museum, Athens
- Owner: Greece
- Website: https://www.namuseum.gr/

The Armed Aphrodite (Greek: Ένοπλη Αφροδίτη) is a marble Roman lifesize sculpture of the first century AD, depicting Aphrodite Areia, or the war-like aspect of the Greek goddess Aphrodite (known to the Romans as Venus), who was more commonly worshipped as a goddess of beauty and love. It is modelled after a lost Greek original of the fourth century BC made by Polykleitos the Younger, and adorned the sanctuary of Asclepius in Epidaurus.

It was unearthed during excavations in the ancient site in 1886, and is now part of the collection of the National Archaeological Museum of Greece in capital Athens with accession number 262. The statue is missing its right forearm, lower legs and feet, and bears significant wear in its face.

== History ==
The statue was found in ancient Epidaurus, in the sanctuary of Asclepius the year 1886 during excavation works, along with several other sculptures in the site. The statue was eventually transferred to the capital Athens, where it has been displayed ever since in the National Archaeological Museum of Athens. The original Greek sculpture, a work of Polykleitos the Younger, would have been produced around the fourth century BC.

== Description ==
The goddess stands upright supporting her weight on her right leg, her left one relaxed, with her head turned left and tilted toward the ground. She is dressed in a thin (almost transparent) chiton that embraces her torso so that the finer curves of her body, especially the pubic triangle and the navel, can be admired. The chiton has slipped off her right shoulder, exposing her firm right breast bare. The chiton is then wound around the left arm, and falling off freely at her side.

The goddess's hair is coiffed in very delicate and wavy tresses, and is tied with a ribbon and placed at the back of her head in a pigtail that is wound in a snood. Across her half-exposed half-dressed chest passes the belt of her scabbard diagonally. She would have bore a sword on her left hand, but it is unknown what the right one held.

It has been suggested (in particular due to the features of the head) that this statue is not a Roman copy but in fact a Greek original of the Hellenistic era.

== Condition ==
Most of the right arm, the feet and the nose of the statue are missing, while the face is heavily damaged; the left arm and the head were found separately and had to be reattached to the rest of the sculpture. With a height of 1,51 m., this parian-marble sculpture is lifesize.

== Aphrodite Areia ==
In ancient Greek cult and religion, the usually love-associated Aphrodite was sometimes worshipped as a war goddess under the epithet Areia (Ancient Greek: Ἀφροδίτη Ἀρεία) or "Aphrodite the Warlike", under which she was depicted in full armor like the war god Ares, her lover. This representation was found in Sparta, Argos, Cythera and Taras (modern Taranto).

== See also ==
- Venus de Milo
- Aphrodite of Rhodes
- Aphrodite of Syracuse
- Aphrodite Hypolympidia

== Bibliography ==
- Kaltsas, Nikolaos (2002). Sculpture in the National Archaeological Museum, Athens. Los Angeles, US: The J. Paul Getty Museum. ISBN 0-89236-686-9.
- Kaltsas, Nikolaos (2007). Εθνικό Αρχαιολογικό Μουσείο [National Archaeological Museum] (PDF) (in Greek). Athens, Greece: OLKOS. ISBN 978-960-89339-1-0.
- Kavvadias, Panagiotis (1890). Γλυπτά του Εθνικού Μουσείου [Sculptures of the National Museum] (in Greek). Athens, Greece: S. K. Vlastos.
