= National Archaeological Museum, Athens =

Museum in Athens, Greece

National Archaeological Museum
- Εθνικό Αρχαιολογικό Μουσείο

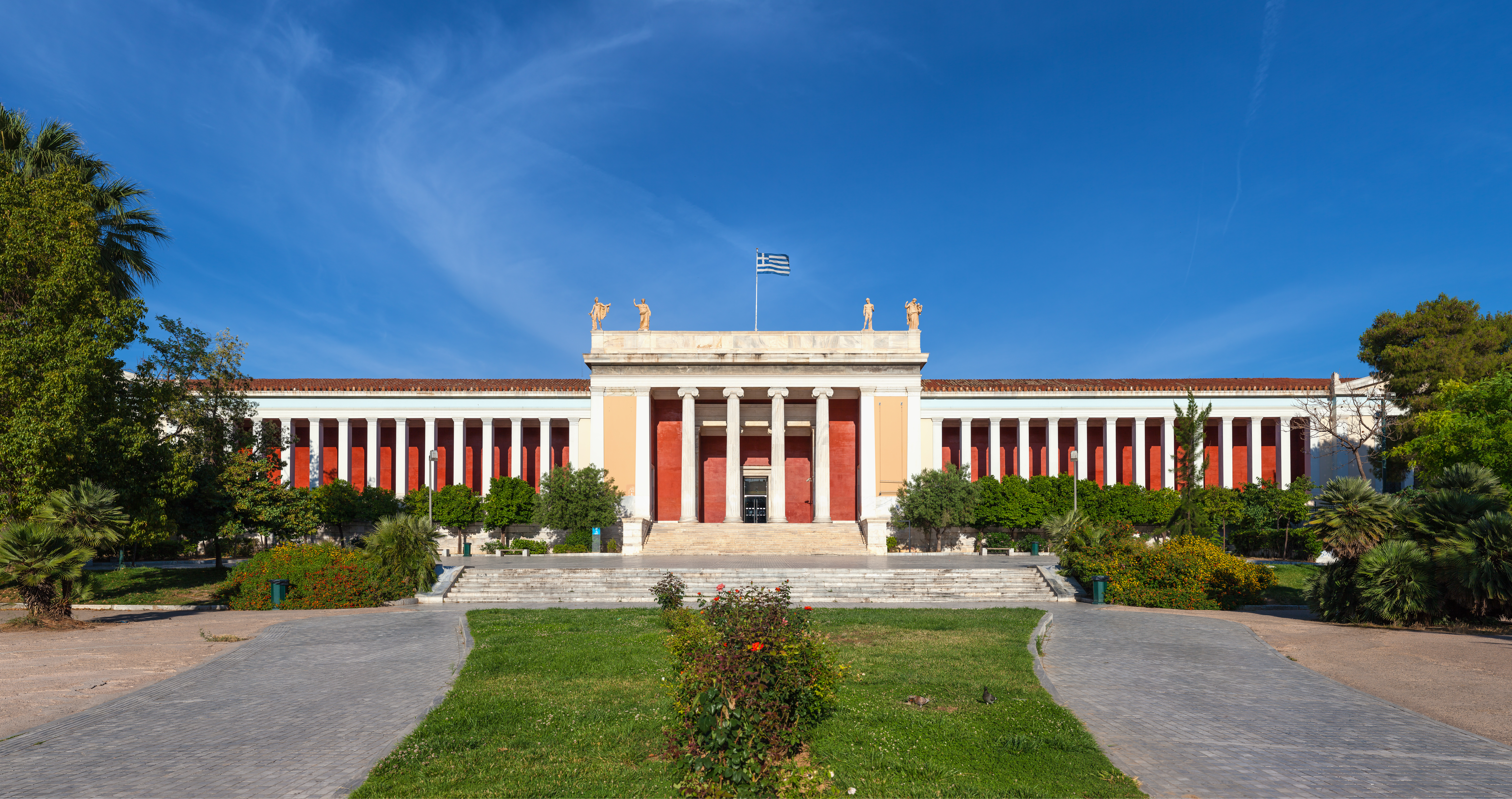
- Façade of the National Archaeological Museum, Athens in 2015

- Location within Athens
- Established: 1829
- Location: Patission Street, Athens, Greece
- Coordinates: 37°59′21″N 23°43′56″E
- Type: National museum
- Public transit access: Victoria station Omonia metro station Exarcheia – Archaiologiko Mouseio (2027)
- Website: www.namuseum.gr/en/

The National Archaeological Museum (Greek: Εθνικό Αρχαιολογικό Μουσείο, romanized: Ethnikó Archaiologikó Mouseío) in Athens houses some of the most important artifacts from a variety of archaeological locations around Greece from prehistory to late antiquity. It is considered one of the greatest museums in the world and contains the richest collection of Greek Antiquity artifacts worldwide. It is situated in the Exarcheia area in central Athens between Epirus Street, Bouboulinas Street and Tositsas Street while its entrance is on the Patission Street, adjacent to the historical building of the National Technical University of Athens.

== History ==
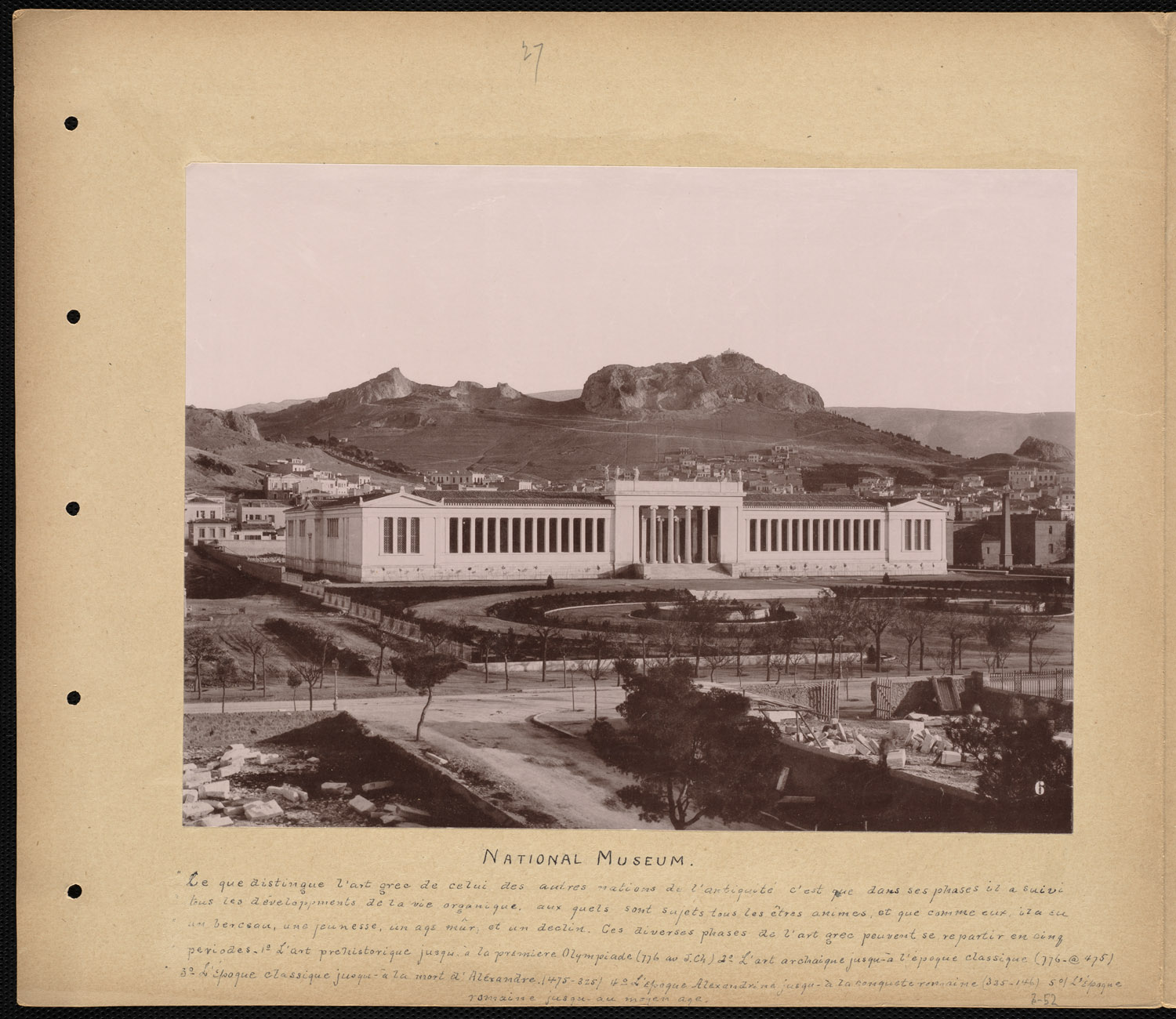
The Museum in 1893

The first national archaeological museum in Greece was established by the governor of Greece, Ioannis Kapodistrias, in Aigina in 1829. Subsequently, the archaeological collection was relocated to a number of exhibition places until 1858, when an international architectural competition was announced for the location and the architectural design of the new museum.

The current location was proposed and the construction of the museum's building began in 1866 and was completed in 1889, using funds from the Greek Government, the Greek Archaeological Society and the society of Mycenae. Major benefactors were Eleni Tositsa who donated the land for the building of the museum, and Demetrios and Nikolaos Vernardakis from Saint Petersburg, who donated a large amount for the completion of the museum.

The initial name for the museum was The Central Museum. It was renamed to its current name in 1881 by the Prime Minister of Greece, Charilaos Trikoupis. In 1887, the archaeologist Valerios Stais became the museum's curator.

During World War II, the museum was closed and the antiquities were sealed in special protective boxes and buried, in order to avoid their destruction and looting. In 1945, exhibits were again displayed under the direction of Christos Karouzos and Semni Karouzou. The south wing of the museum houses the Epigraphical Museum with the richest collection of inscriptions in the world. The inscriptions museum expanded between 1953 and 1960, with the architectural designs of Patroklos Karantinos.

== The building ==
The museum has an imposing neo-classical design which was very popular in Europe at the time and is in accordance with the classical style artifacts that it houses. The initial plan was conceived by the architect Ludwig Lange and it was later modified by Panagis Kalkos who was the main architect, Armodios Vlachos and Ernst Ziller. At the front of the museum there is a large neo-classic design garden which is decorated with sculptures.

== Expansions and renovations ==
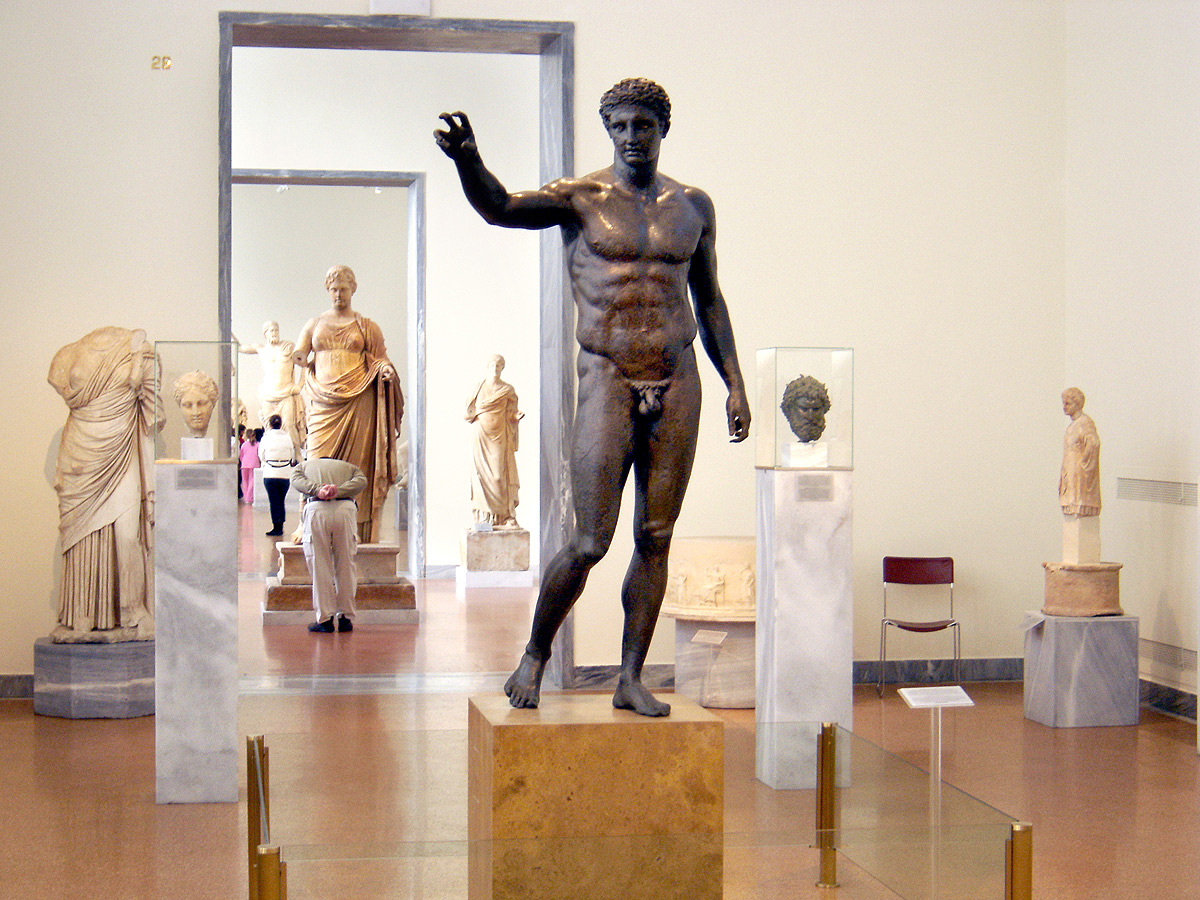
The Antikythera Ephebe

The building has undergone many expansions. Most important were the construction of a new east wing in the early 20th century, based on the plans of Anastasios Metaxas and the construction of a two-storeyed building, designed by George Nomikos, during 1932–1939. These expansions were necessary to accommodate the rapidly growing collection of artifacts. The most recent refurbishment of the museum took more than 1.5 years to complete, during which the museum remained completely closed. It reopened in July 2004, in time for the Athens Olympics and it included an aesthetic and technical upgrade of the building, installation of a modern air-conditioning system, reorganisation of the museum's collection and repair of the damage caused by the 1999 earthquake. The Minoan frescoes rooms opened to the public in 2005. In May 2008, the Culture Minister, Mihalis Liapis, inaugurated the much anticipated collection of Egyptian antiquities and the collection of Eleni and Antonis Stathatos.

In 2020, there was renewed discussion regarding the need to further expand the museum to adjacent areas. A new plan was made for a subterranean expansion at the front of the museum.

In 2023, the Greek government approved plans for a 20,000 square metre underground extension to the museum. The extension is expected to be completed by 2028 and will also feature a rooftop garden.

== Collections ==
The museum's collections are organised in sections:

Collections
| Section | Rooms | Sample inventories |
|---|---|---|
| Prehistoric Collection (Neolithic, Cycladic, Mycenaean) | 3–6 and 48 | The Mask of Agamemnon, a gold funeral mask, dated 1550–1500 BC Gold elliptical funeral diadems from Shaft Grave III (Grave Circle A, Mycenae) Mycenean gold cups from Grave IV and V |
| Sculptures Collection | 7–34 | The bronze statue of Zeus or Poseidon, the Artemision Bronze in room 15 Varvakeios Athena, replica of Athena Parthenos Statue of Asklepius. Roman copy (c. 160 AD), from a 4th-century BC Greek original Marble table support adorned by a group including Dionysos, Pan and a Satyr, 170-180 AD Aphrodite, Pan and Eros complex. |
| Vase and Minor Objects Collection (Including Stathatos and Vlastos-Serpieris collections) | 42 and 49–56 | Attic vase depicting Chimera Bronze pitchers |
| Santorini Collection | 48 | Fresco from the Bronze Age at Akrotiri, Santorini The boxing boys fresco is one of many well preserved frescoes from the island of Thera Fresco with landscape in spring time at Akrotiri Akrotiri Antelopes fresco |
| Metallurgy Collection | 36–39 | The Antikythera mechanism (main fragment) in room 38 The philosopher's head from the Antikythera wreck Bronze pitcher |
| Egyptian and Near Eastern Antiquities Collection | 40–41 | Egyptian funerary mask Egyptian Necklace Statue |
| Epigraphical Museum | 1, 9 & 11 | The oldest attic epigraphy, 8th century BC Boustrophédon, in room 11 Detail of a part of the sacred law of the Acropolis and the Hékatompédon, 485/4 BC Honorific decree, 313–312 BC. |

=== Prehistoric collection ===
The prehistoric collection displays objects from the Neolithic era (6800–3000 BC), Early and Mid-Bronze Age (3000–2000 BC and 2000 to 1700 BC respectively), objects classified as Cycladic and Mycenaean art.

==== Neolithic era and early and mid-Bronze Age collection ====
There are ceramic finds from various important Neolithic sites, such as Dimini and Sesclo, and from middle Helladic ceramics from Boeotia, Attica and Phthiotis. Some objects from Heinrich Schliemann excavations in Troy are also on display. Key highlights of the collections include:

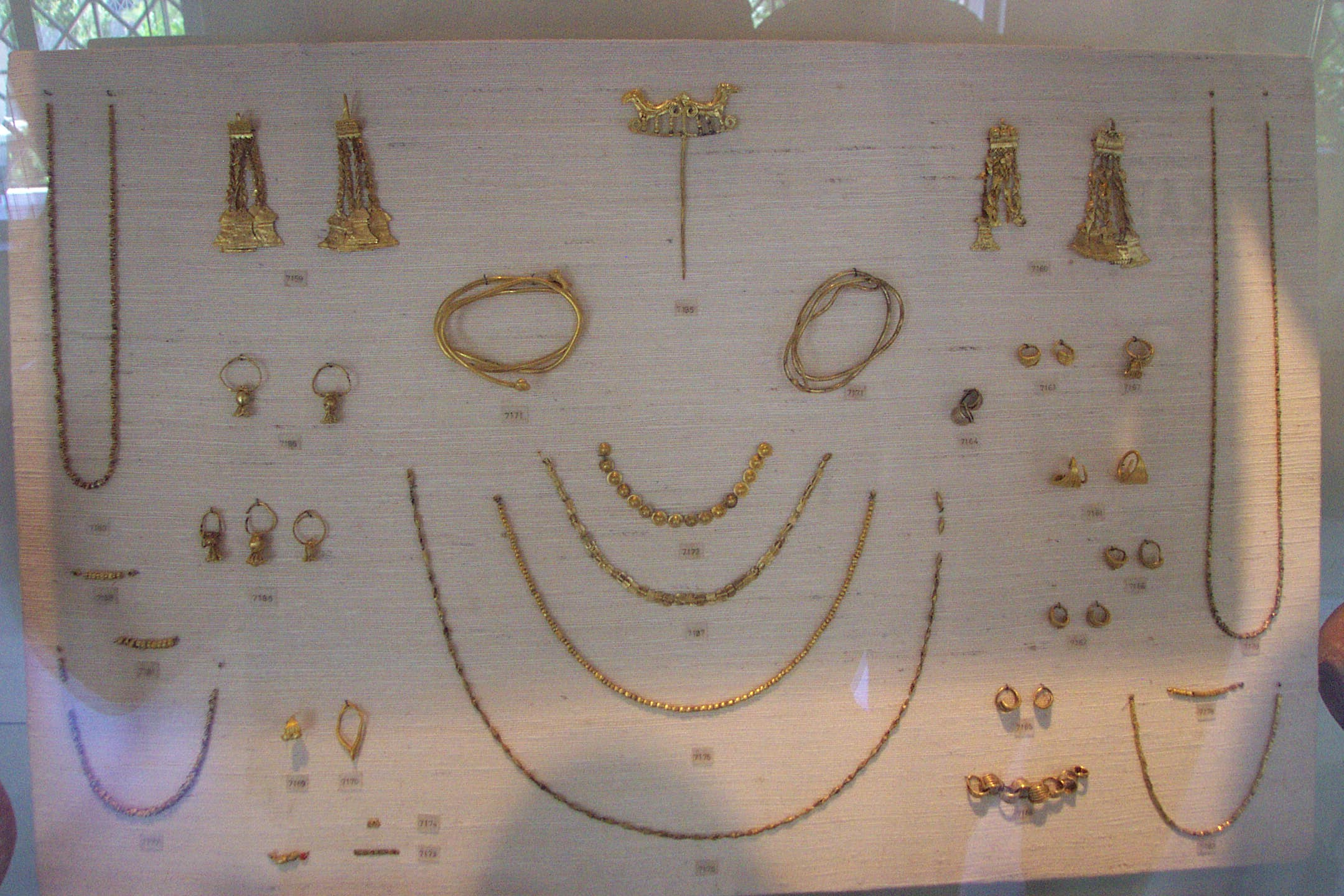
Gold treasure from Polichni

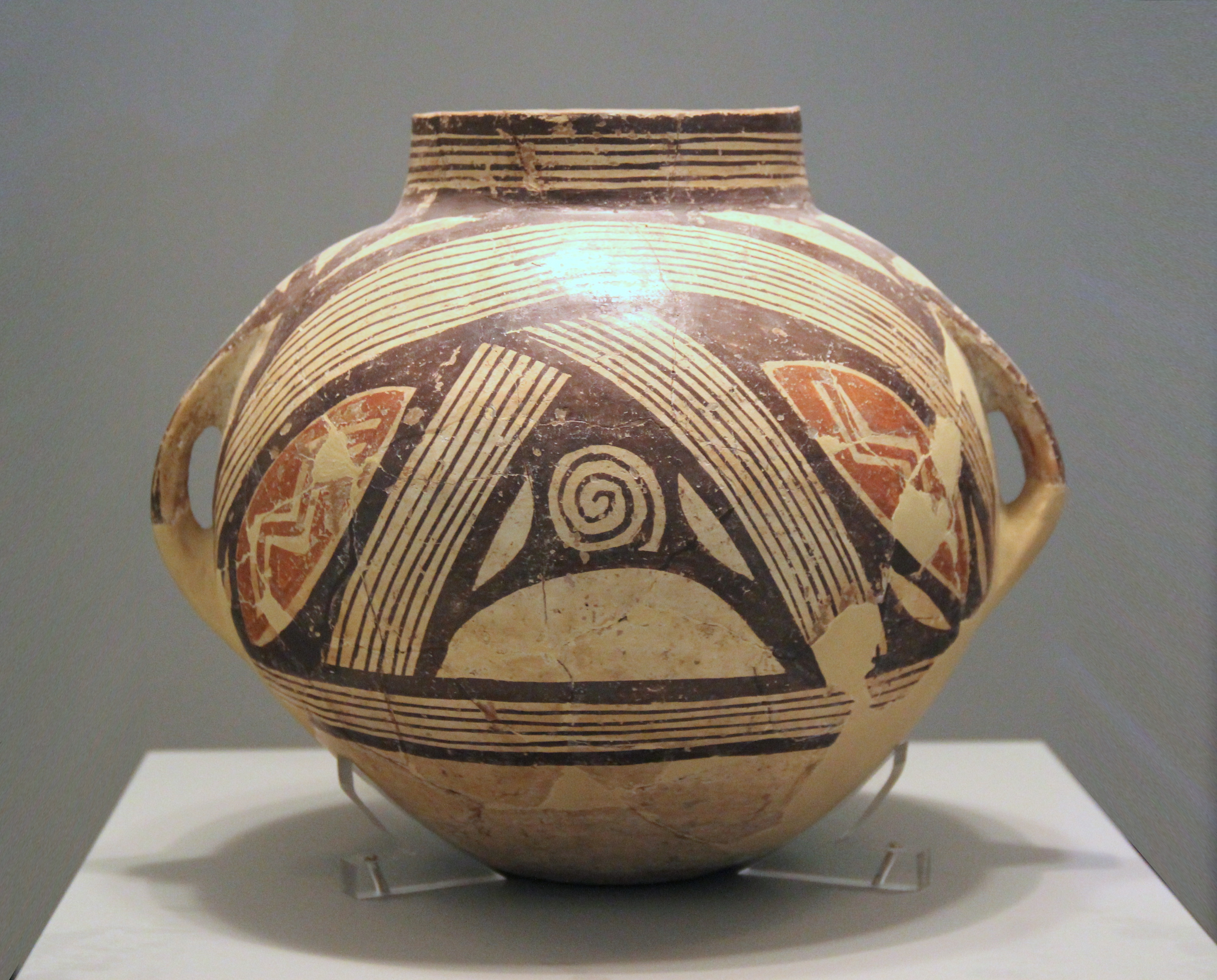
Clay vase with polychrome decoration

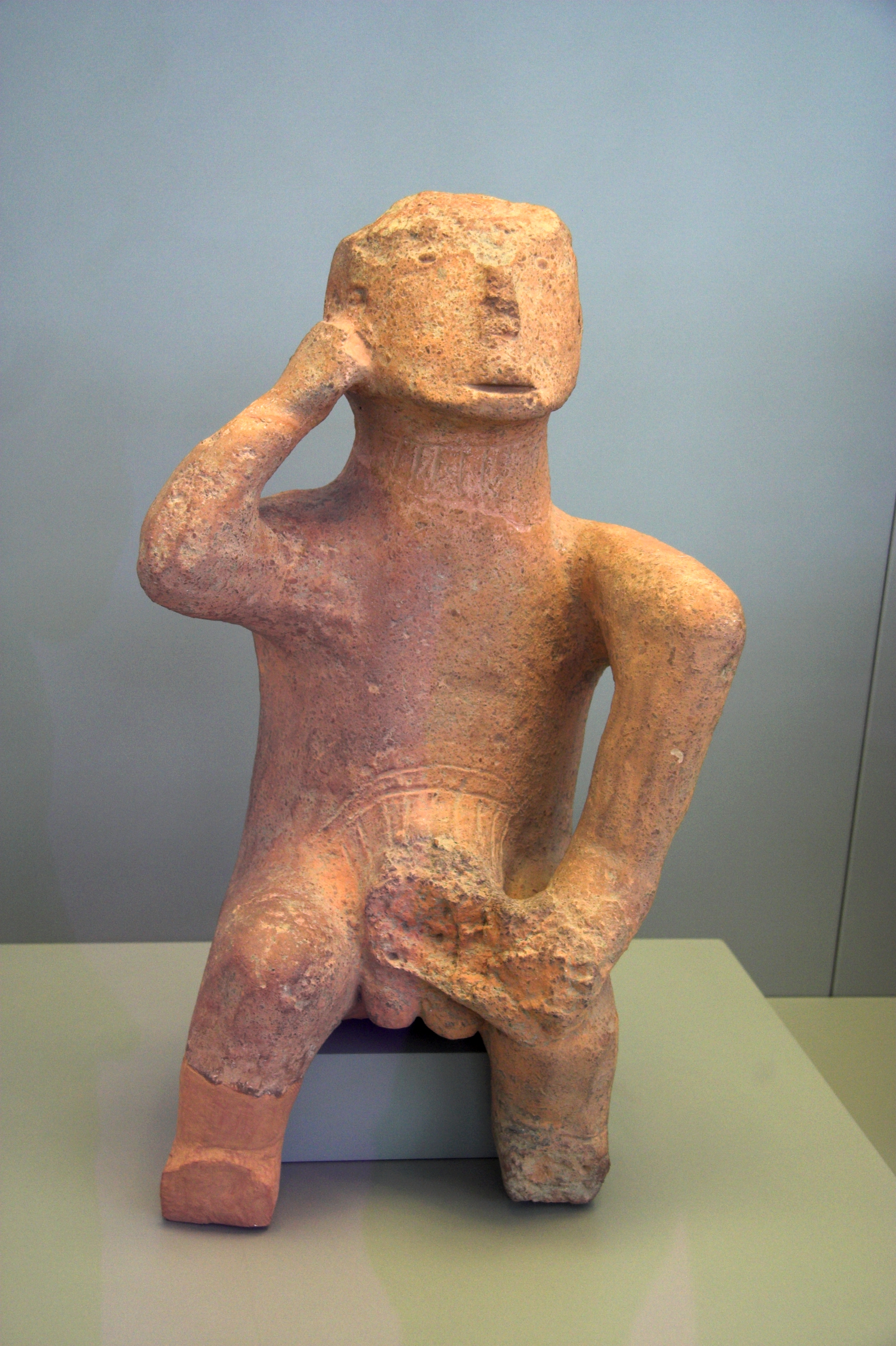
Larger terracotta figurine "The Thinker", Neolithic Period, 4500-3300 BC, Karditsa, Thessaly

==== Cycladic art collection ====
The Cycladic collection features the famous marble figurines from the Aegean Islands of Delos and Keros, including the Lutist. These mysterious human representations, which resemble modern art and inspired many artists, such as Henry Moore, came from the 3rd millennium BC old cemeteries of Aegean islands along with bronze tools and containers.

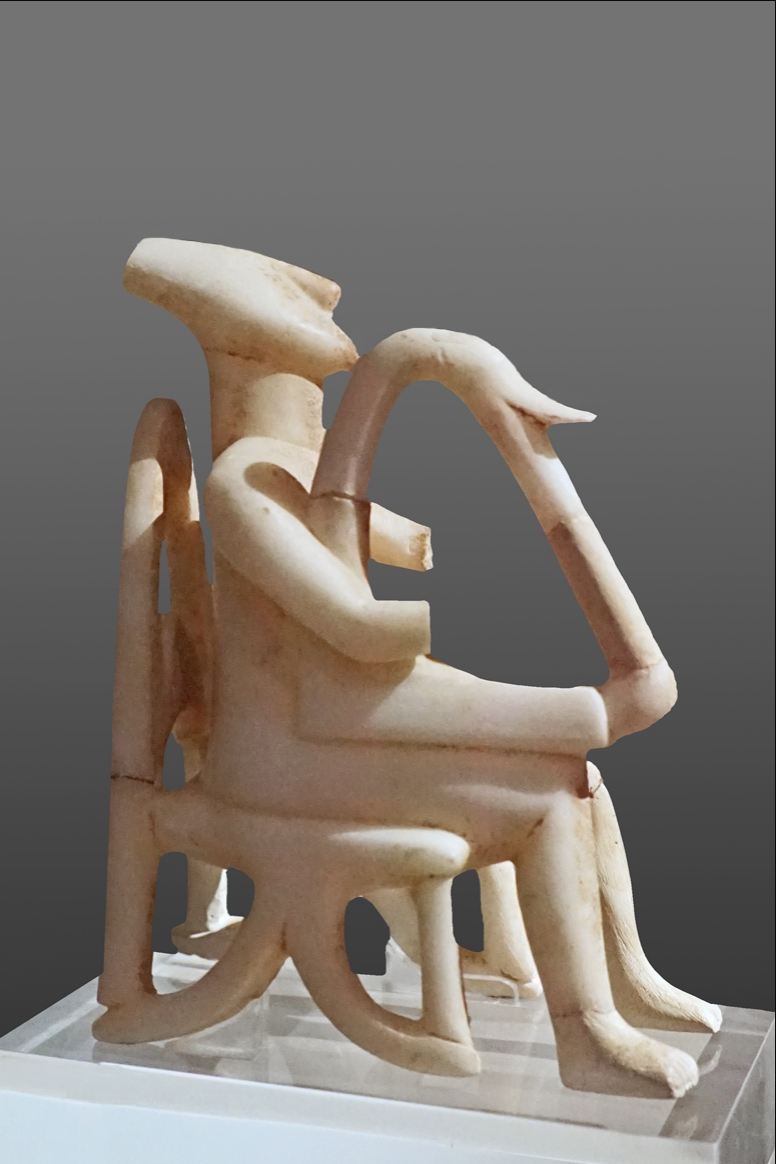
Harpist figurine from Keros

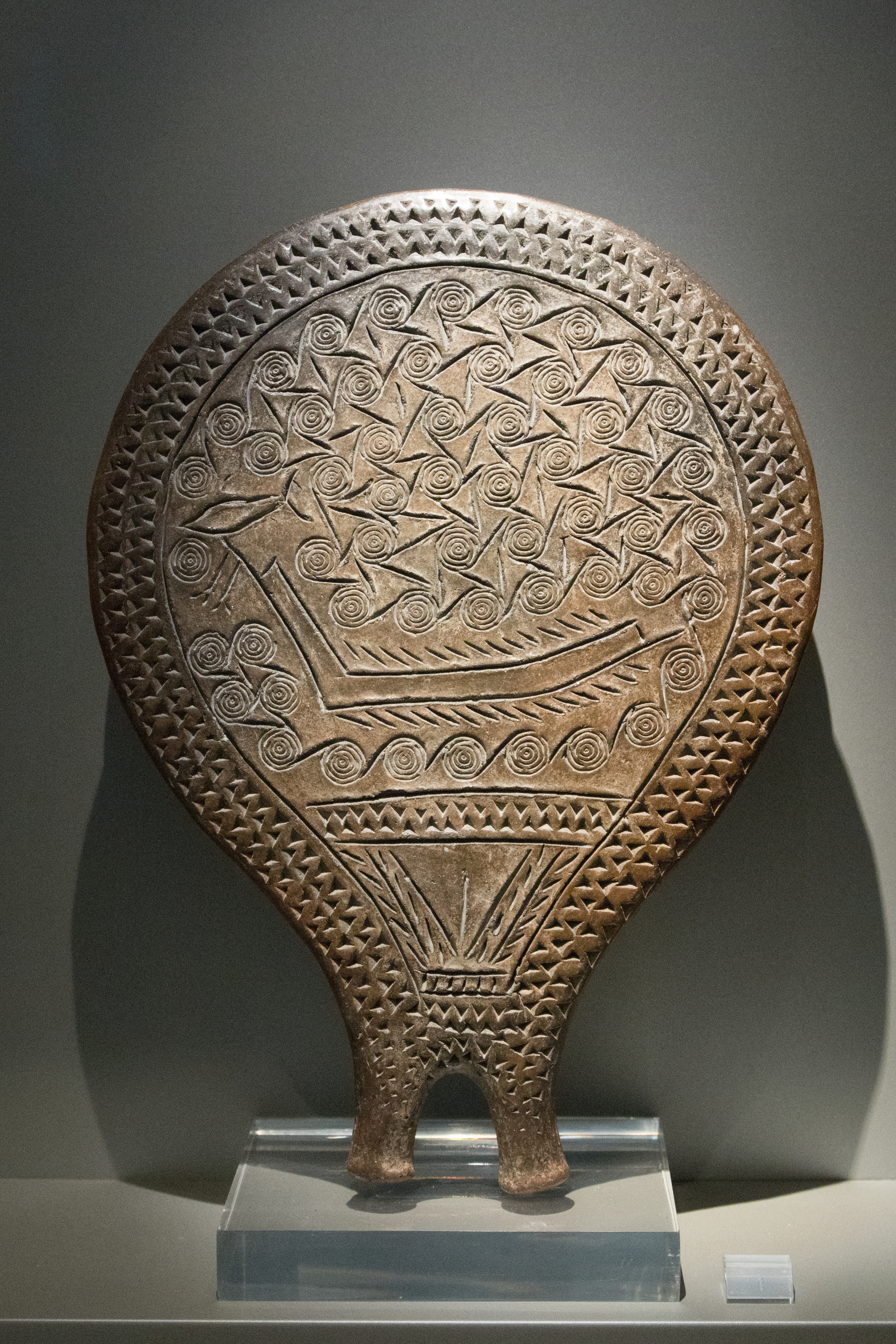
Cycladic frying pan from Syros

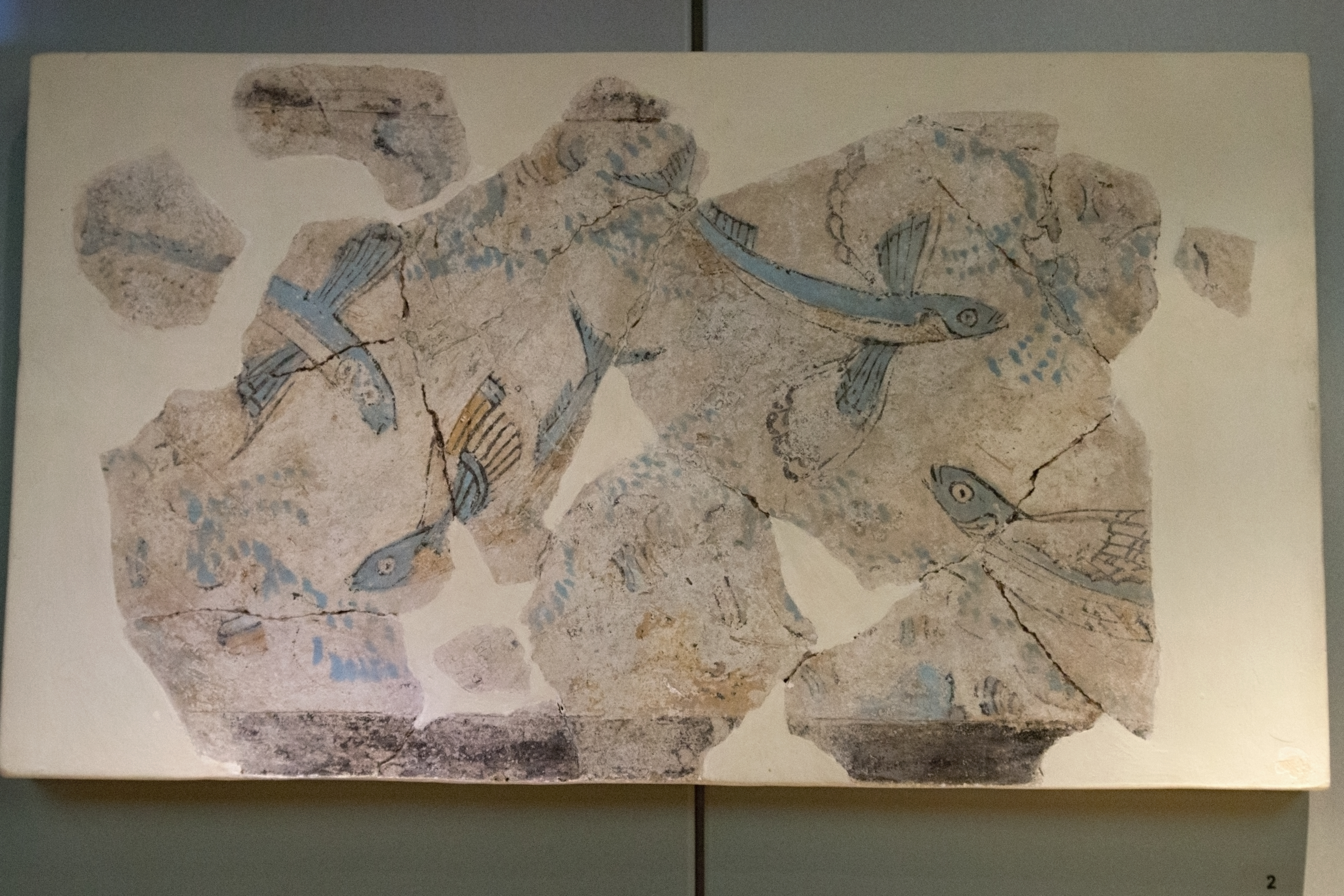
Flying-fish wall painting fragment from Phylakopi Melos

==== Mycenean art collection ====
Mycenean civilization is represented by stone, bronze and ceramic pots, figurines, ivory, glass and faience objects, golden seals and rings from the vaulted tombs in Mycenae and other locations in the Peloponnese (Tiryns and Dendra in Argolis, Pylos in Messinia and Vaphio in Lakonia). Of great interest are the two golden cups from Vafeio showing a scene of the capture of a bull.

==== Heinrich Schliemann finds ====
Mycenean collection includes also the magnificent 19th-century finds of Heinrich Schliemann in Mycenae from the Grave Circle A and the earlier Grave Circle B. Most notable are the golden funerary masks which covered the faces of deceased Mycenean nobles. Among them, the most famous is the one that was named erroneously as the mask of Agamemnon. There are also finds from the citadel of Mycenae including relief stelae, golden containers, glass, alabaster and amber tools and jewels. Other features include an ivory carving of two goddesses with a child, a painted limestone head of a goddess and the famous warrior's vase dating from the 12th century.

=== Egyptian art collection ===
The Egyptian collection dates back to the last twenty years of the 19th century. Notable is the donation of the Egyptian government which in 1893 offered nine mummies of the era of the Pharaohs from Bab el-Gasus. However, the Egyptian collection is mainly by two donors, Ioannis Dimitriou (in 1880) and of Alexandros Rostovic (in 1904). In total, the collection includes more than 6000 artefacts, 1100 of which are available presently for the public. The collection is considered to be one of the best collections of Egyptian art in the world.

The exhibition features rare statues, tools, jewels, mummies, a wooden body tag for a mummy, a bronze statue of a princess, intact bird eggs and a 3000-year-old loaf of bread with a bite-sized chunk missing. The exhibition centrepiece is a bronze statue of the princess-priestess Takushit, dating to around 670 BC. Standing 70 cm high and wearing a gown covered in hieroglyphs, the statue was found south of Alexandria in 1880.

=== Stathatos collection ===
The Stathatos collection is named for the donors and major Greek benefactors Antonis and Eleni Stathatos. The collection features about 1000 objects, mainly jewels as well as metal objects, vases, and pottery from the Middle Bronze Age to post-Byzantine era. Features of special note are the Hellenistic period golden jewels from Karpenissi and Thessaly.

== Artists and artifacts ==
Some of the ancient artists whose work is presented in the museum are Myron, Scopas, Euthymides, Lydos, Agoracritus, Agasias, Pan Painter, Wedding Painter, Meleager Painter, Cimon of Cleonae, Nessos Painter, Damophon, Aison, Analatos Painter, Polygnotos, and Hermonax.

Collections include sculpture work, Loutrophoros, amphora, Hydria, Skyphos, Krater, Pelike, and lekythos vessels, stele, frescoes, jewellery, weapons, tools, coins, toys and other ancient items.

Artifacts derive from archaeological excavations in Santorini, Mycenae, Tiryns, Dodona, Vaphio, Rhamnous, Lycosura, Aegean islands, Delos, the Temple of Aphaea in Aegina, the Sanctuary of Artemis Orthia in Sparta, Pylos, Thebes, Athens, Vari Cave, the Antikythera wreck and from various other places in Greece.

The museum houses the archaic terracota statuette daidala that inspired the designers of the 2004 Athens Olympics mascots, Athena and Phevos.

== New exhibits ==
Two of the newest exhibits of the museum include a 4th-century BC golden funerary wreath and a 6th-century BC marble statue of a woman, which were returned as stolen artifacts to Greece in 2007 by the J. Paul Getty Museum in Los Angeles, after a 10-year-long legal dispute between the Getty Center and the Greek Government. One year earlier, the foundation agreed to return a 4th-century BC tombstone from near Greek Thebes and a 6th-century BC votive relief from the island of Thassos.

== Museum highlights ==
- Antikythera Ephebe
- Antikythera mechanism
- Aphrodite of Syracuse
- Apollo Omphalos
- Armed Aphrodite
- Artemision Bronze
- Atalante Hermes
- Bronze statuettes of athletic Spartan girls
- Bust of Antinous
- Capitoline Venus
- Daidala
- Diadumenos
- Dipylon inscription
- Funerary naiskos of Aristonautes
- Funerary Stela of Demokleides
- Great Eleusinian Relief
- Group of Aphrodite, Pan and Eros
- Heracles of Antikythera
- Hermes Criophorus
- Hermes of Aegium
- Jockey of Artemision
- Kouroi and Korai:
  - Kroisos Kouros
  - Merenda Kouros
  - Phrasikleia Kore
  - Sounion Kouros
- Lemnos stela
- Lenormant Athena
- Lycosoura Artemis
- Lycosoura Demeter
- Mantineia Base
- Marathon Boy
- Mask of Agamemnon
- Mycenean Warrior Vase
- Nestor's Cup
- Nike of Epidaurus
- Nike of Megara
- Ninnion Tablet
- Pitsa panels
- Poseidon of Melos
- Rhyton in the shape of a bull head
- Theseus Ring
- Varvakeion Athena
- Wall frescoes from Tiryns and Santorini

== Library of archaeology ==
The museum houses a 118-year-old library of archeology with rare ancient art, science and philosophy books and publications. The library has some 20,000 volumes, including rare editions dating to the 17th century. The bibliography covers archaeology, history, arts, ancient Greek religion and ancient Greek philosophy, as well as Ancient Greek and Latin literature. Of particular value are the diaries of various excavations including those of Heinrich Schliemann. The collection of archaeology books is the richest of its kind in Greece. The Library has been recently renovated with funds from the Alexander S. Onassis Foundation. Its renovation was completed on 26 May 2008 and is now named after Alexander Onassis.

== Museum activities ==
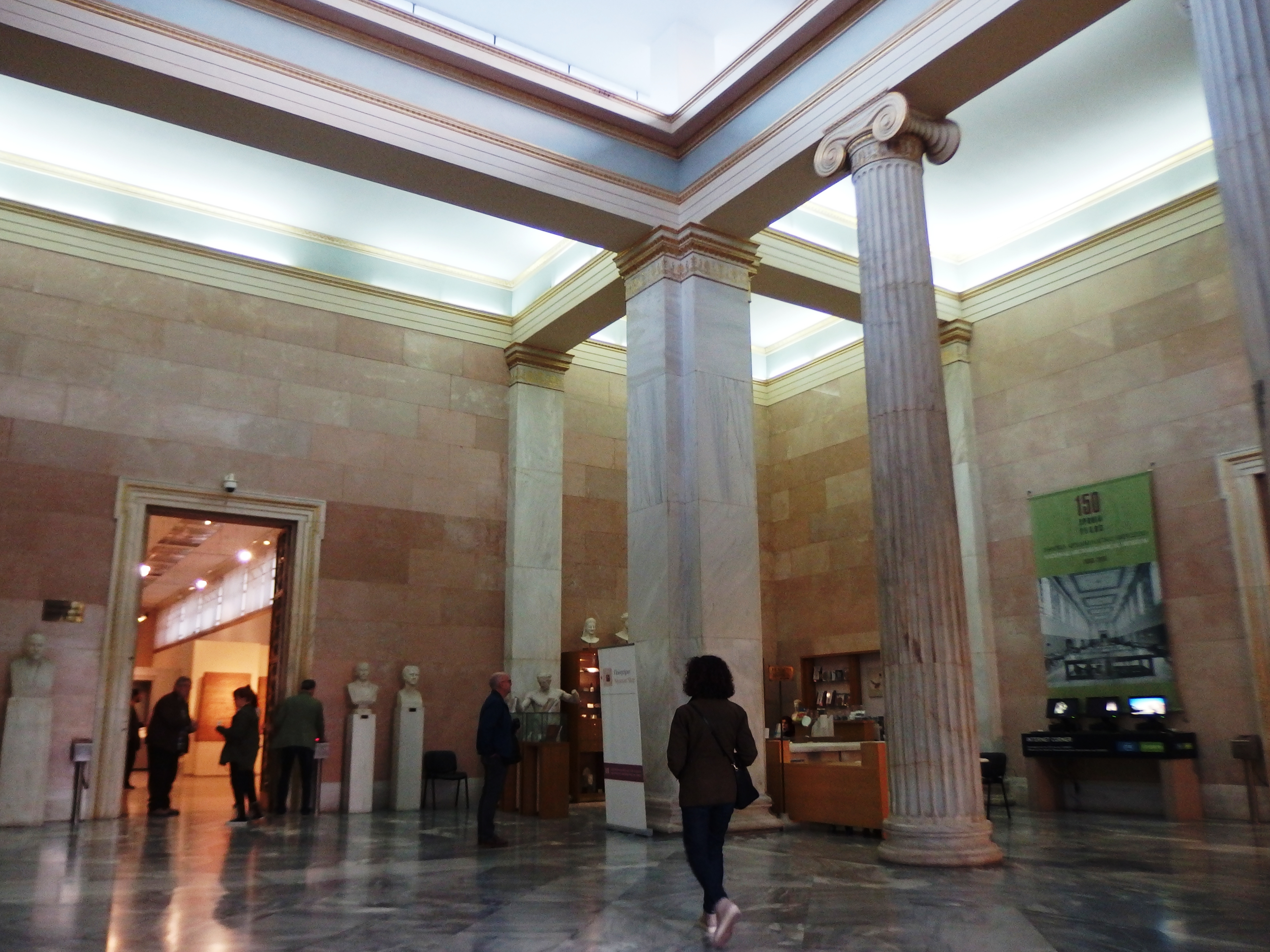
- Athens, National Archaeological Museum, hall.
  Conservation laboratories
- Photographic archive and chemistry laboratories
- Organises temporary exhibitions in the museum and abroad
- Hosts a large number of archaeology related lectures in its lecture-hall annually

== Access ==
The museum is accessible by the Athens Metro. The nearest station is Victoria Station (Line 1) and it is within a 5-minute walk from the museum. The museum houses a gift shop with artifact replicas and a café in the sculpture garden. The museum is fully wheelchair accessible. There are also facilities and guides for hearing-impaired visitors. It is next to the old building of the National Technical University and is served by bus, trolleybus and metro. It is not served by Proastiakos or the Athens Tram.

== See also ==
- Ancient Greek art
- Ancient Greek sculpture
- Ancient Greek technology
- Gorgons
- Greek terracotta figurines
- Kouros
- List of museums in Greece
- List of museums of Greek and Roman antiquities
- Pottery of ancient Greece
- Typology of Greek vase shapes
