= Polykleitos the Younger =

4th-century BC Greek architect

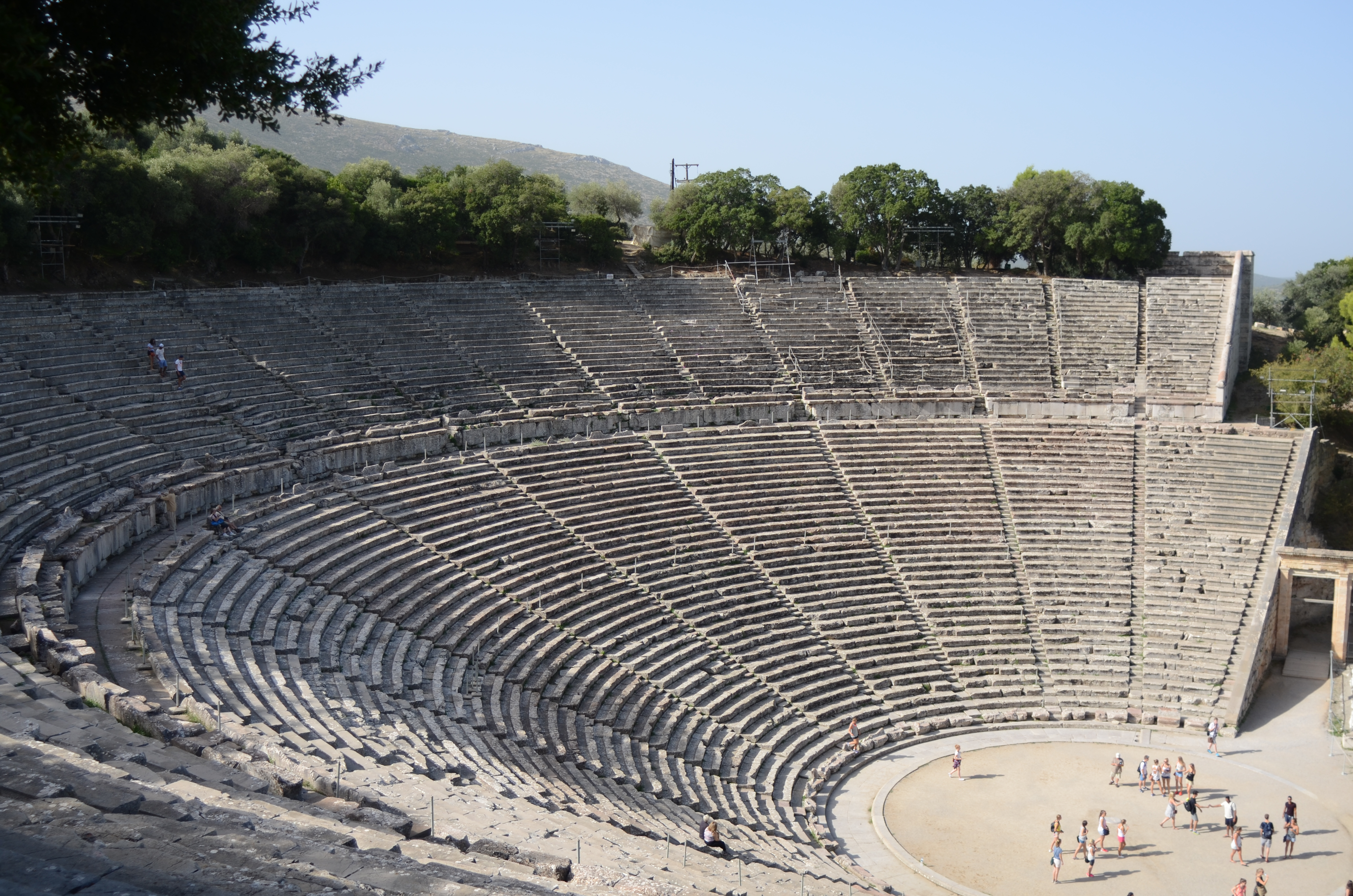
Epidavros.JPG

Polykleitos the Younger (Ancient Greek: Πολύκλειτος; fl. c. 4th century BC) was an Ancient Greek sculptor of athletes. His greatest achievements, however, were as an architect. Polykleitos the Younger was the architect of the Theatre and Tholos at Epidaurus. Started around 360 BC, the Tholos exhibited elaborate detailing, especially on the Corinthian capitals of its interior columns. These columns would influence most later designs for that order. He was the son of the Classical Greek sculptor Polykleitos, the Elder. Later in his life, Polykleitos built many other works of art, most of his work on athletes.

== See also ==
- Armed Aphrodite, Roman copy of one of his works
