= Wedding Painter =

Ancient Greek red-figure vase painter

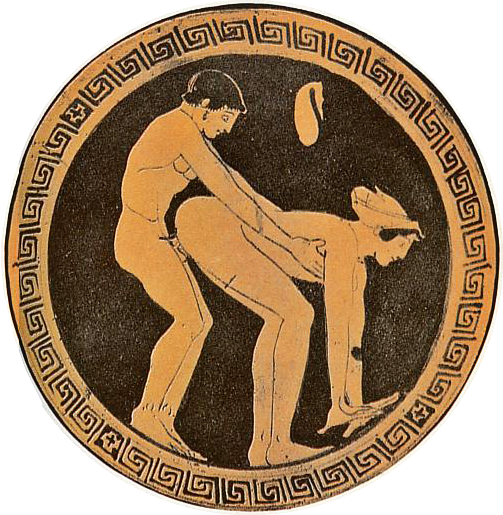
A man and a hetaera (her status indicated by the money-bag hanging from the wall) having sexual intercourse. Interior painting of a red-figure kylix, c. 480/470 BC. Spain, private collection.

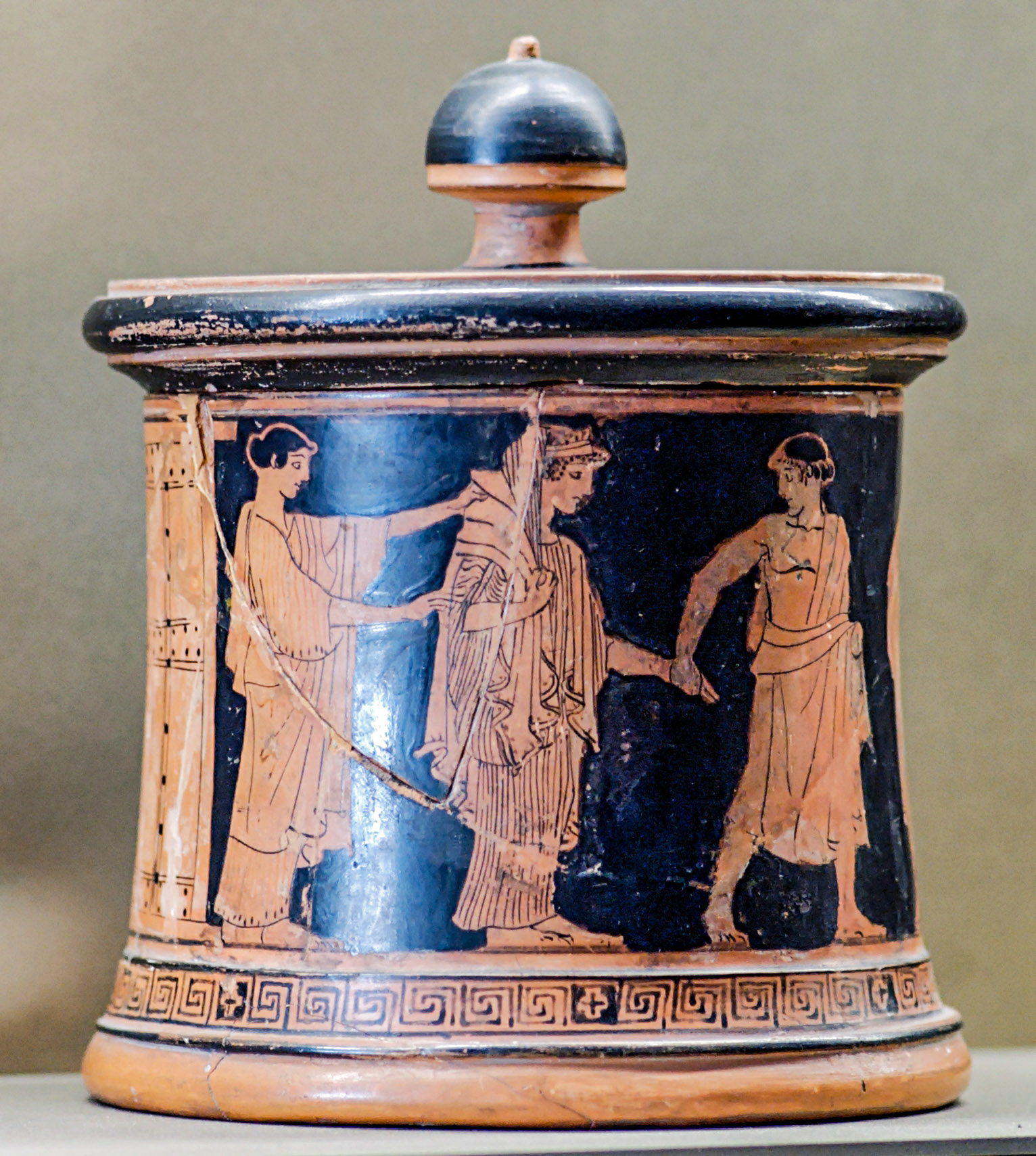
The Wedding painter's name vase, a pyxis, ca.470/460 BC. Louvre L 55.

Wedding Painter is the conventional name for an ancient Greek vase painter active in Athens from circa 480 to 460 BC. He painted in the red-figure technique. His name vase is a pyxis in the Louvre depicting the wedding of Thetis and Peleus.

== Works ==
- Athens, National Archaeological Museum

krater 1388 • pyxis 14908

- Barcelona, Museo Arqueologico

fragment of a bowl 584 • fragment of a bowl stand 4339

- Berkeley, University of California, Robert H. Lowie Museum

bowl 924 A

- Berlin, Antikensammlung

lip cup F 2547

- Bologna, Museo Civico Archeologico

fragment of a bowl 373 • bowl 374

- Bonn, Akademisches Kunstmuseum

bowl 144 A

- Boston, Museum of Fine Arts

bell krater 95.26

- Chiusi, Museo Archeologico Nazionale

bowl 1845

- Compiègne, Musee Vivenel

bowl 1090 • bowl 1104

- Ferrara, Museo Nazionale di Spina

skyphos T 441

- Florence, Museo Archeologico Etrusco

fragment of a bowl 11 B 10 • fragment of a bowl 17 B 7 • fragment of a bowl 20 B 11 • fragment of a bowl PD 28 • fragment of a bowl PD 172 • fragment of a bowl PD 289 • fragment of a bowl PD 563

- Freiburg, Albert-Ludwigs-Universität

Fragment of a bowl

- London, British Museum

hydria E 226

- formerly Munich, private collection Paul Arndt

bowls

- formerly New Haven, Clairmont

pyxis

- New York City, Metropolitan Museum

pyxis 39.11.8

- Padula, Salerno, Museo Archeologico della Lucania Occidentale nella Certosa di Padula

Fragment of a bowl stand

- Paris, Musée National du Louvre

bowl CP 10952 • fragment of a bowl CP 11605 • fragment of a bowl CP 11606 • fragment of a bowl CP 11607 • fragment of a bowl CP 11608 • fragment of a bowl CP 11609 • fragment of a bowl CP 11610 • fragment of a bowl CP 11611 • bowl G 269 • bowl G 630 • pyxis L 55

- Prague, Charles University

lekythos 22.62

- Reggio Calabria, Museo Nazionale

2 fragments of bowls • fragment of a skyphos

- Thessaloniki, Archaeological Museum

fragment of a kantharos 34.157

- Vienna, Kunsthistorisches Museum

bell krater 1771 • bowl 2150

- Winchester, College Museum

bowl 71

== Bibliography ==
- John Beazley: Attic Red-figure Vase-painters, 2nd ed. Oxford 1963, p. 922-924.
