= Archaeological Museum of Rethymno =

Museum in Rethymno, Greece

Coordinates: 35°22′18.5″N 24°28′22.5″E

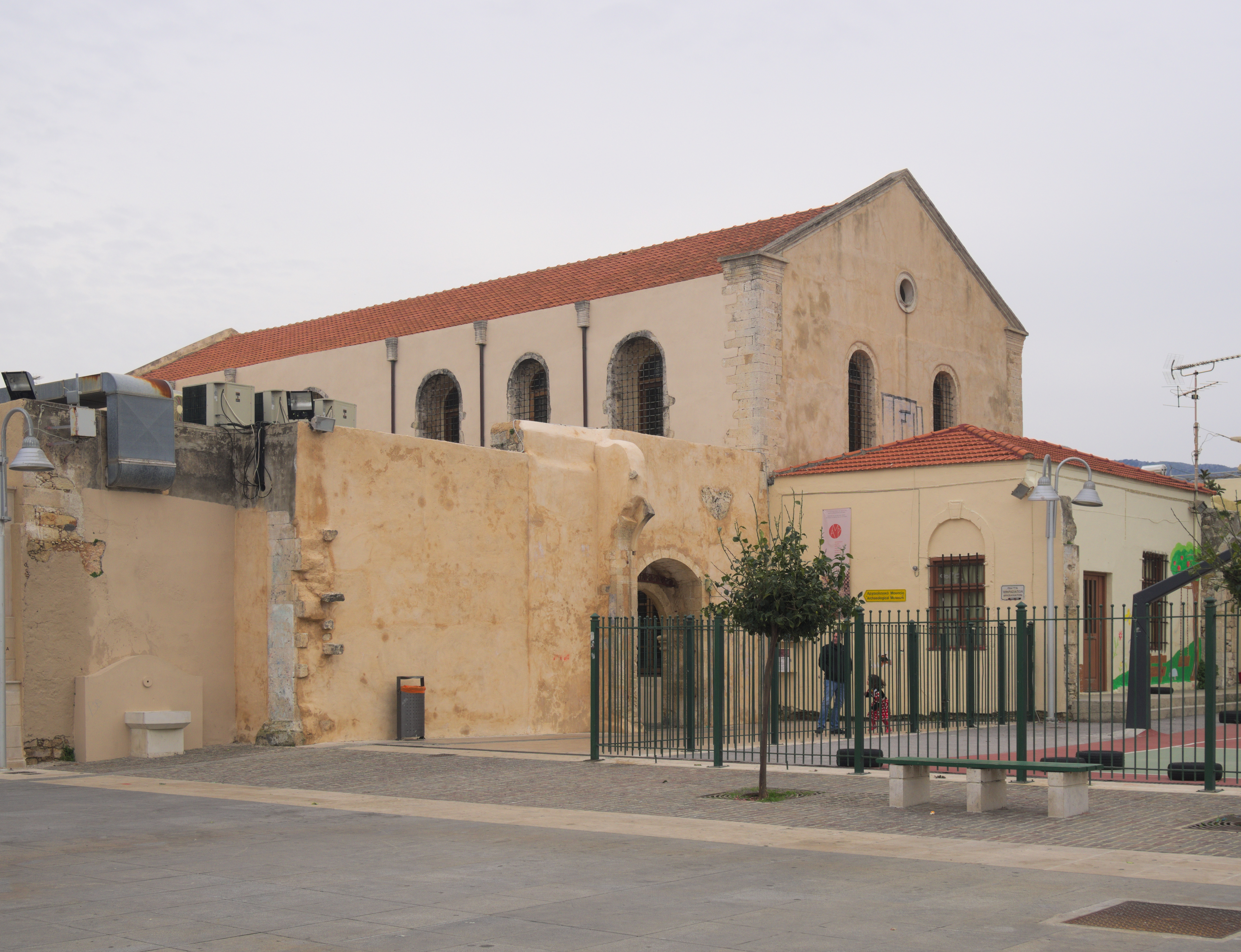
The museum, housed in a former church building.

The Archaeological Museum of Rethymno is a museum in Rethymno, Crete, Greece. The building that houses the museum is the church of Saint Francis, built by the Barozzi family around 1530. Today it’s one of the world’s smallest museums. Since the building housing the museum used to be Saint Francis’s church, that’s why the street where the museum is located is named Agiou Fragkiskou (= Saint Francis Street).

== Gallery ==
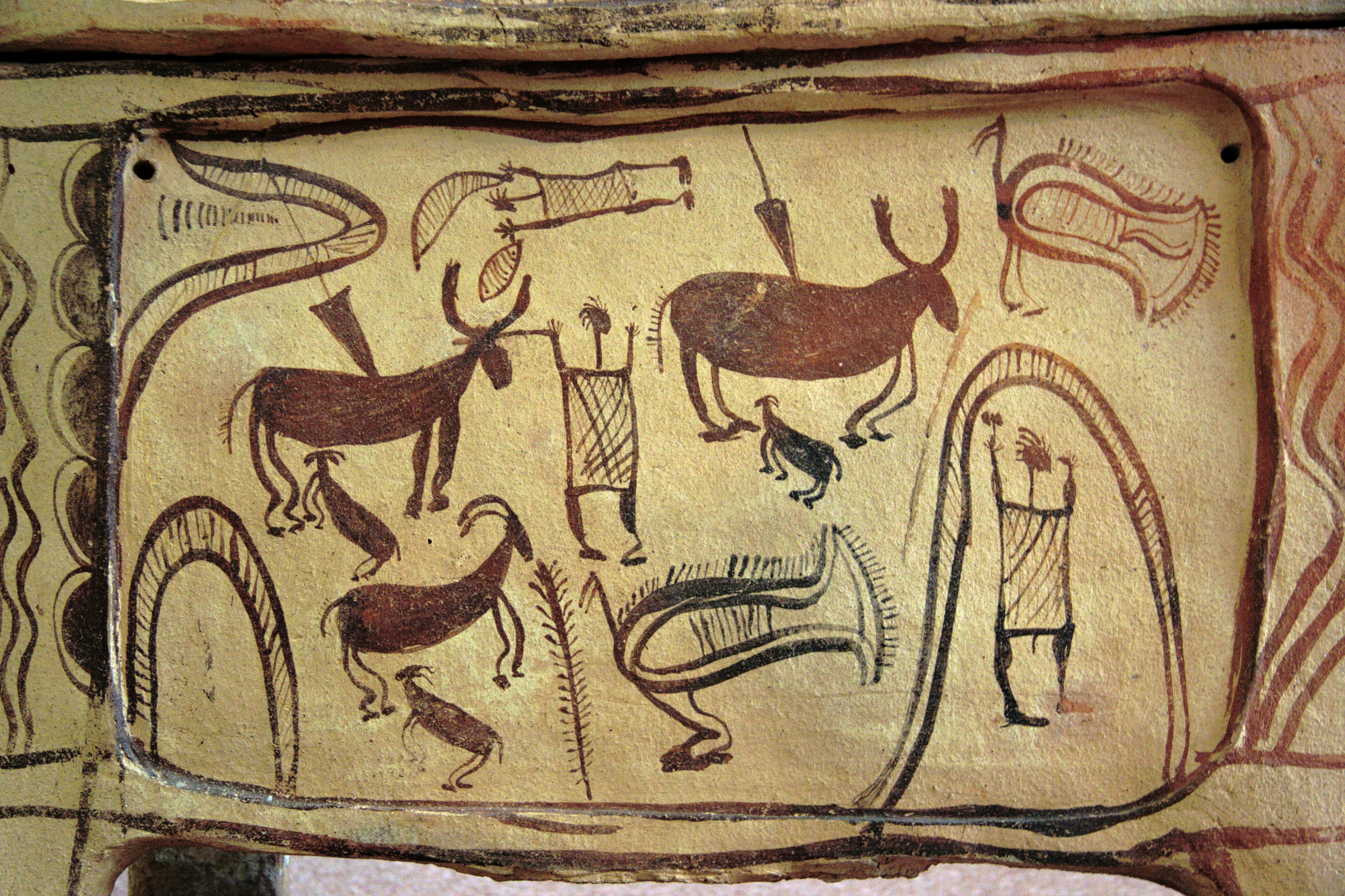
Early Minoan larnax.

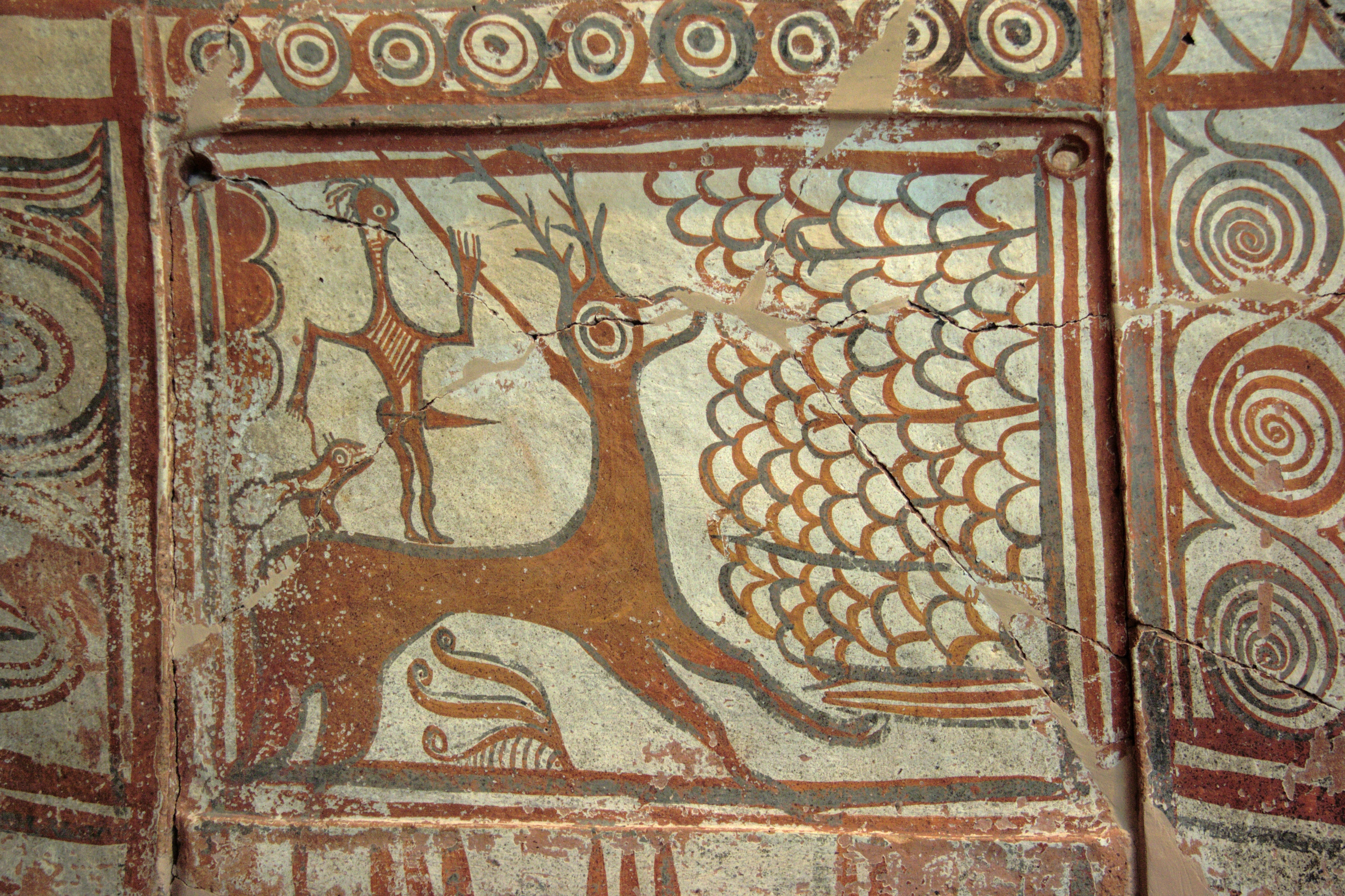
Minoan larnax, probably Prepalatial period.

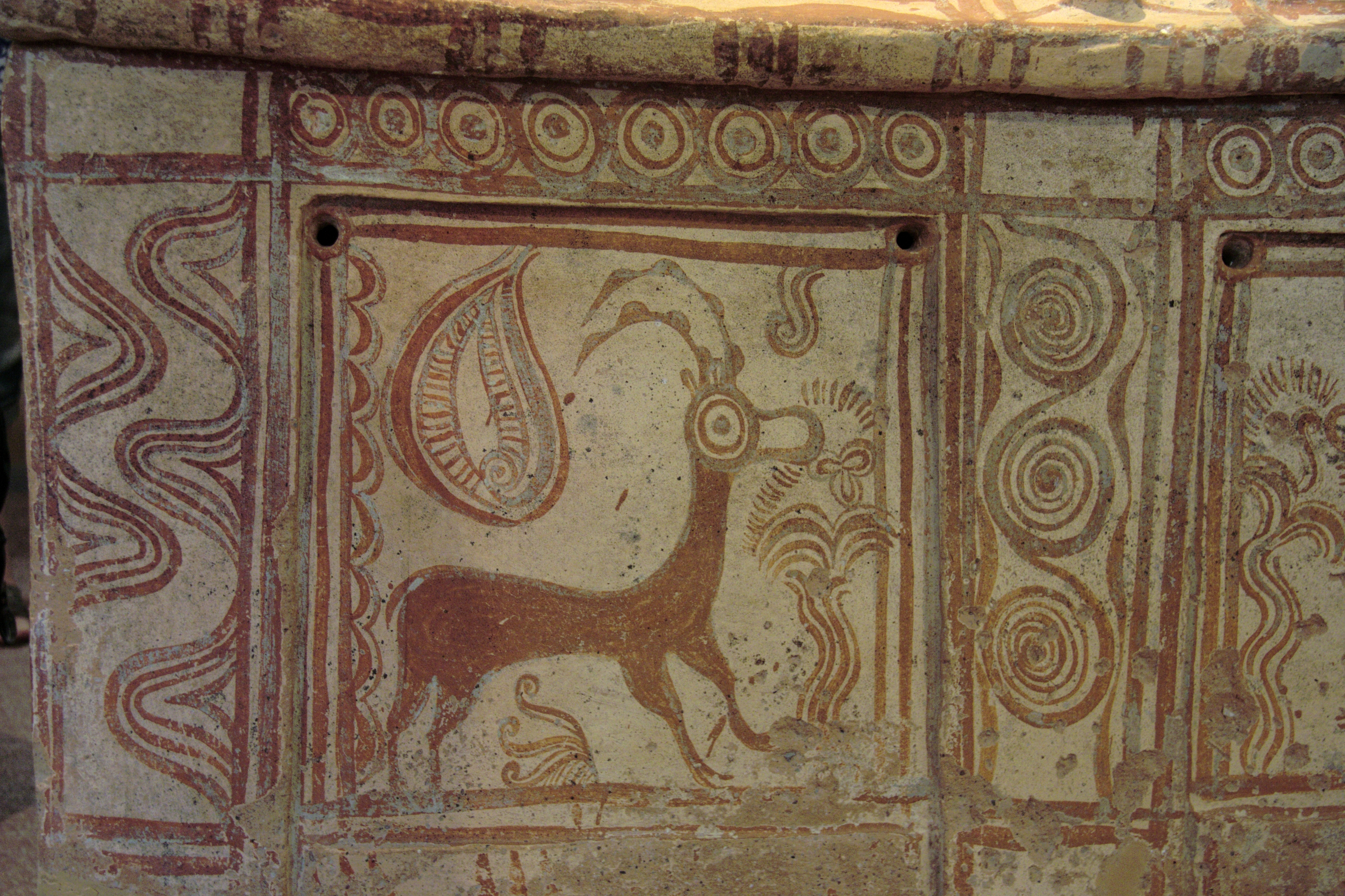
Minoan larnax, probably Prepalatial period.

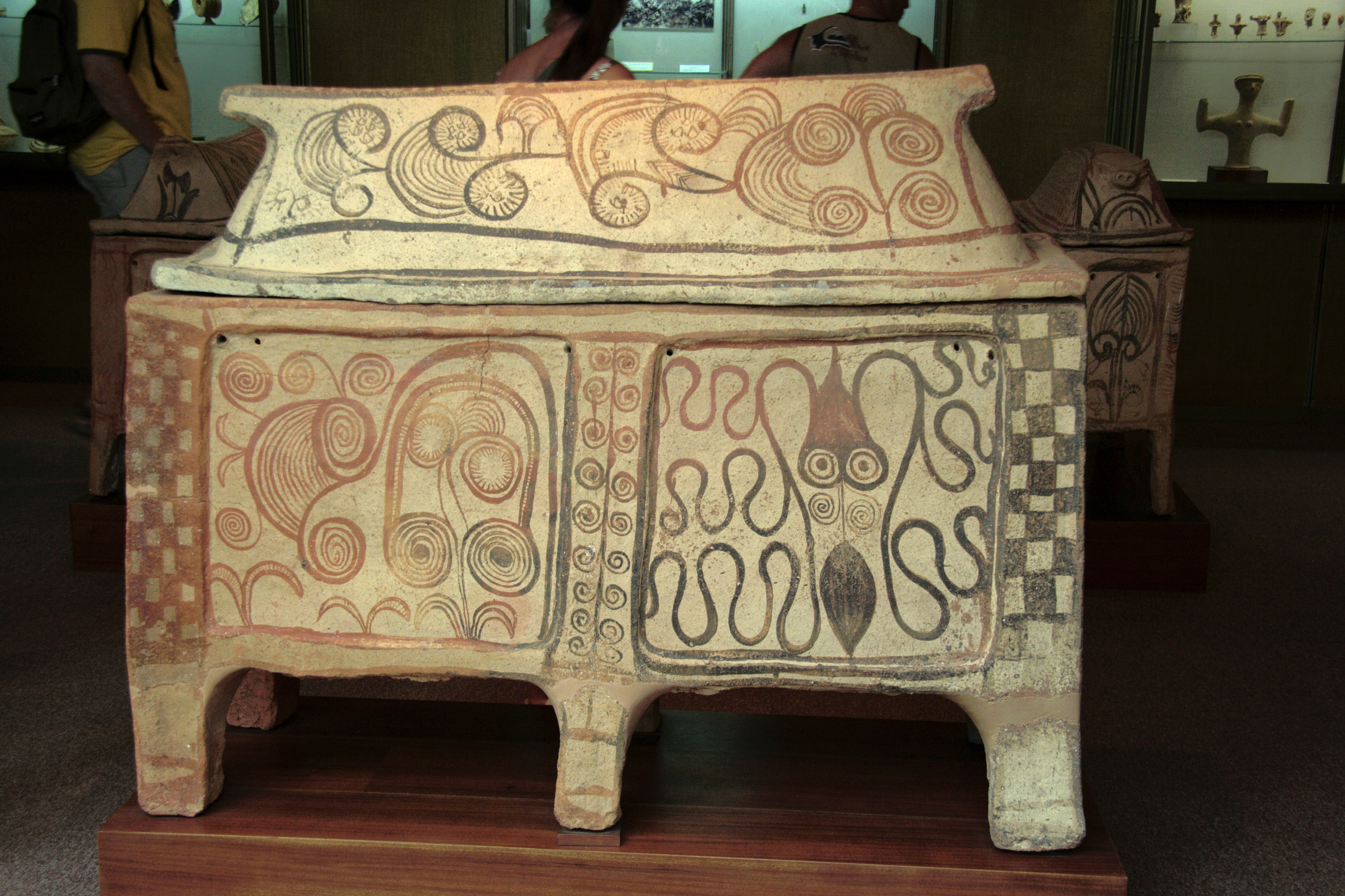
Minoan larnax, probably Neopalatioal period, Marine style

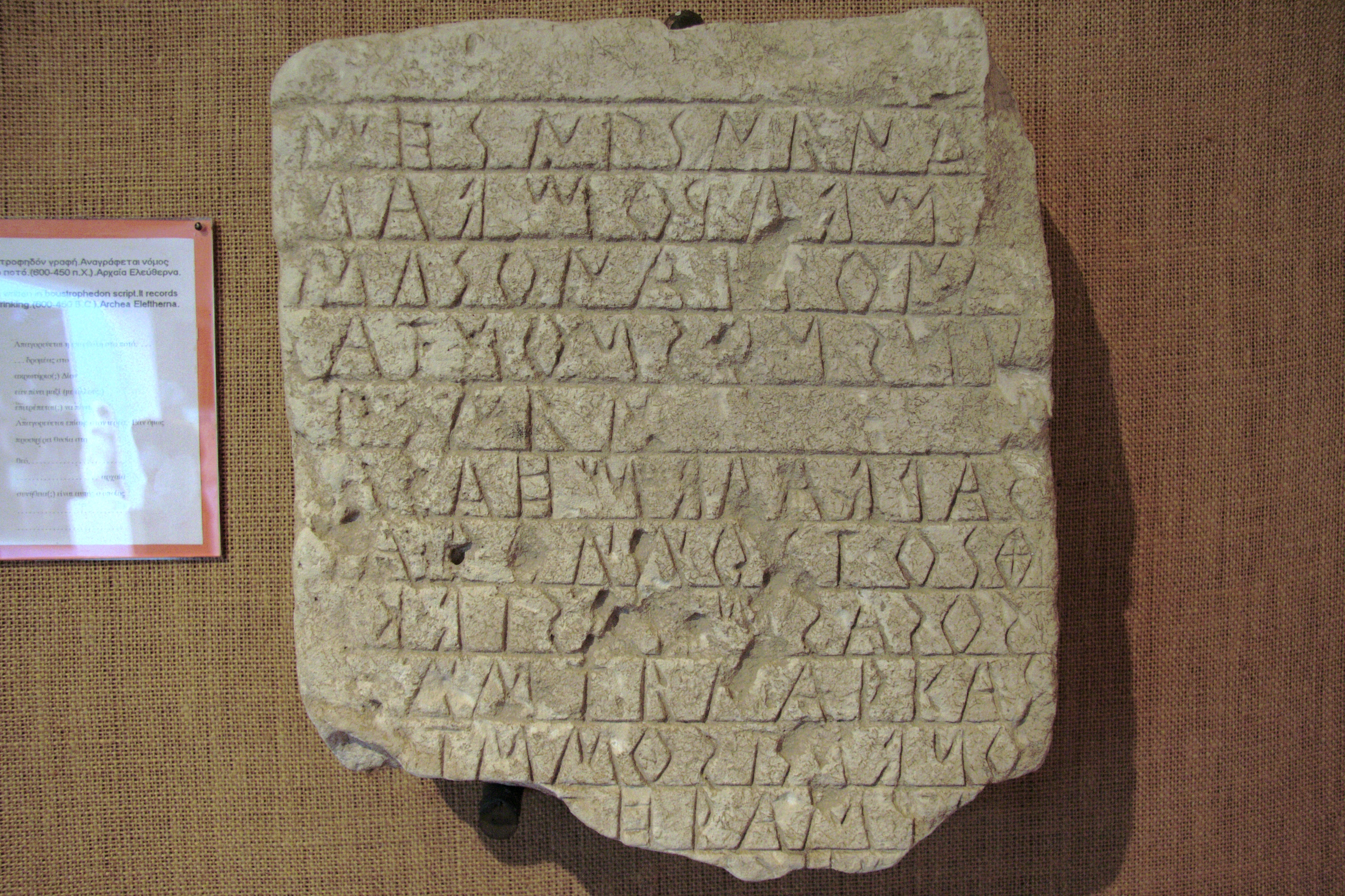
Archaic Greek inscription (boustrophedon script), law against excessive drinking in Ancient Eleftherna, 600-450 BC.

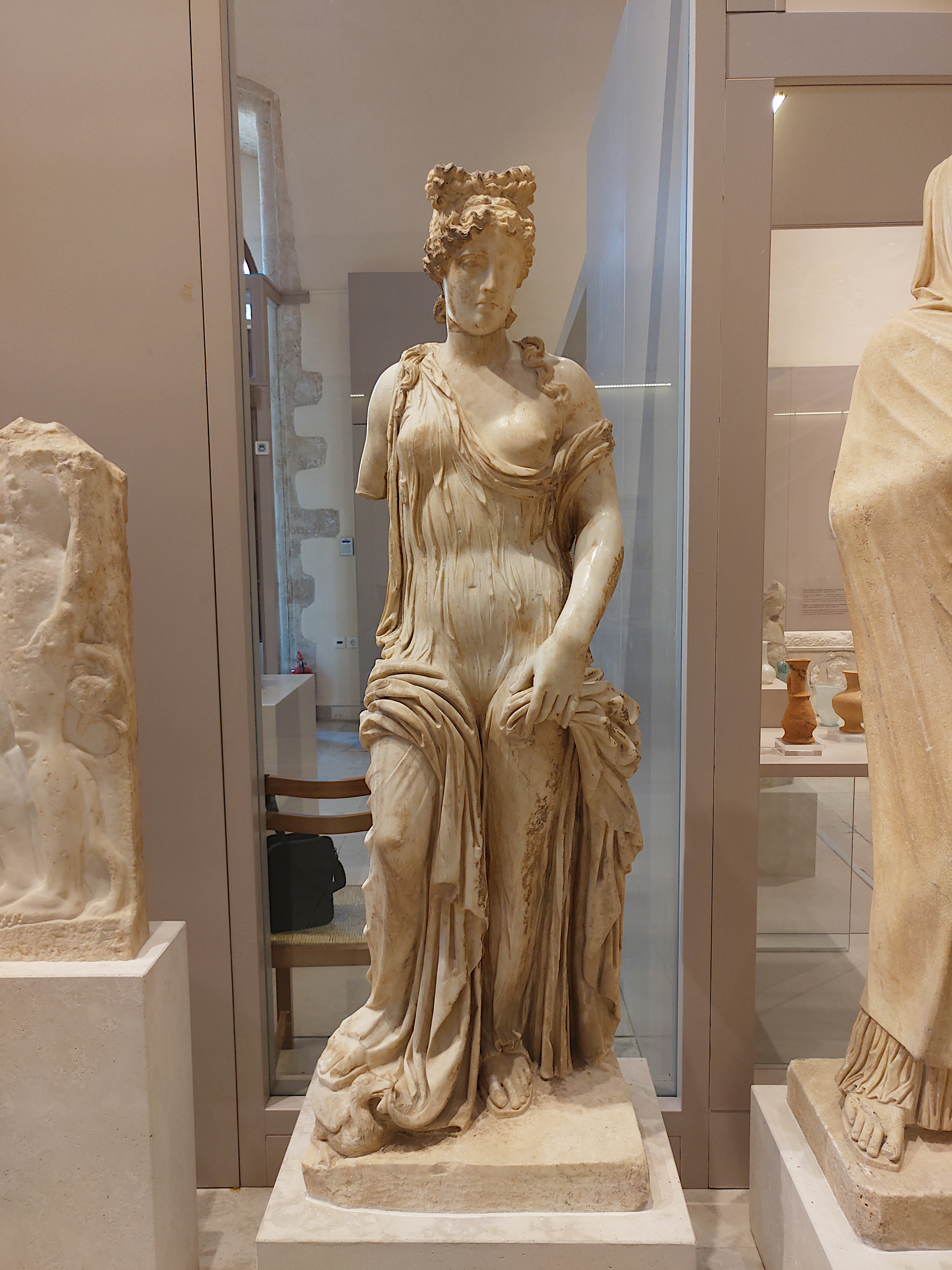
Aphrodite Rhithymnia, Roman period.
