= Aphrodite Heyl =

Statuette of Aphrodite

Coordinates: 52.5194°N 13.3983°E

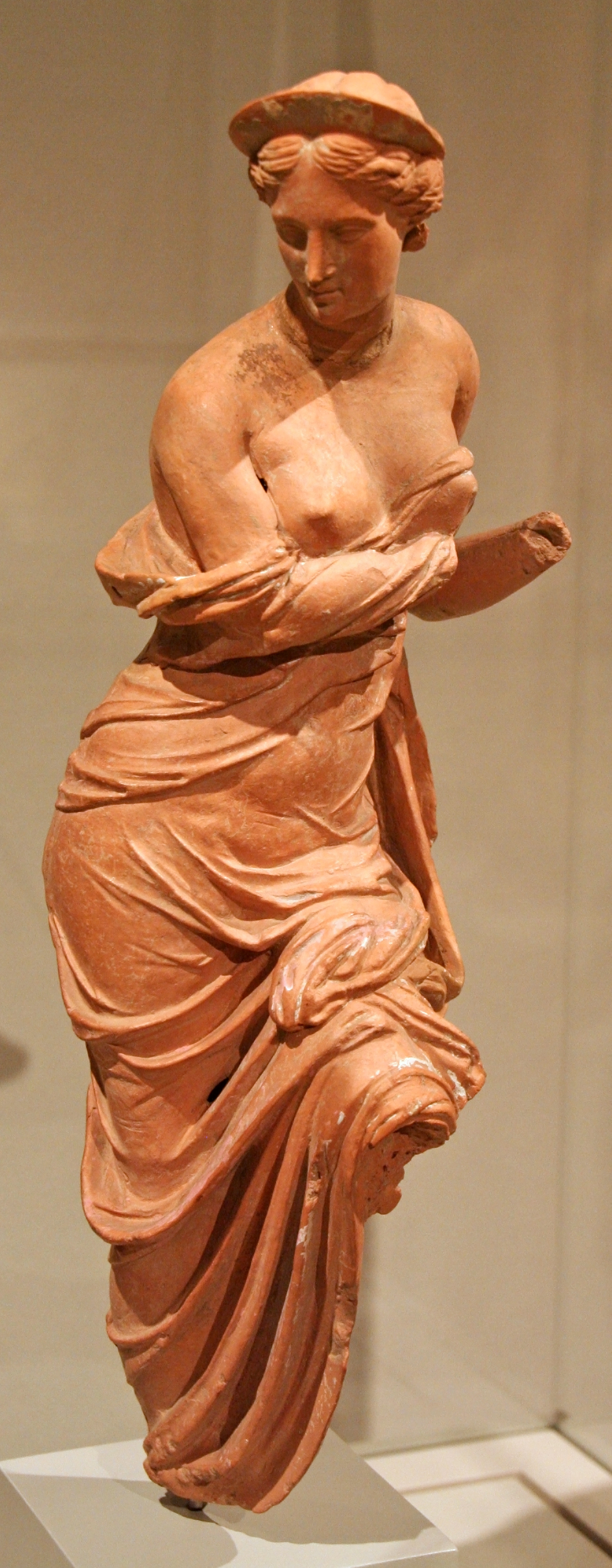
The Aphrodite Heyl

The statuette of Aphrodite known as Aphrodite Heyl in the Antikensammlung Berlin (inventory number 31272) is an especially finely worked terracotta statue from the second century BC.

== Description and history ==
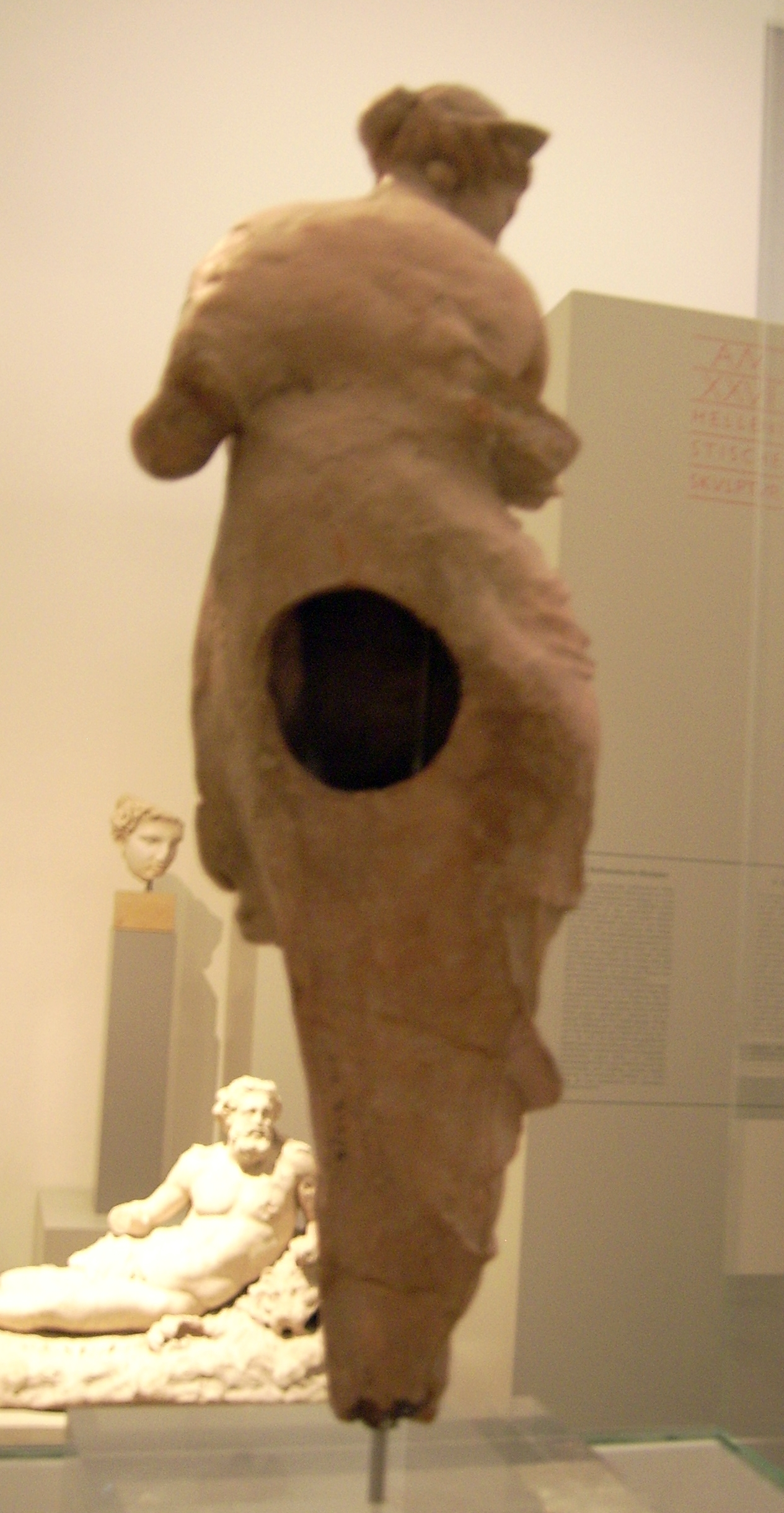
Back view

This depiction of Aphrodite created from terracotta is particularly sinuous and of outstanding quality. The clothing, made from a thin material, has fallen from her right breast and shows more than it covers. Especially around her abdomen, the material is very tight and allows the contours of her body to be clearly recognised. Since the arms and legs have broken off and do not survive, any attributes which would have helped to identify her are lost and her exact nature cannot be determined for sure. Since the goddess is turning her head away from whatever she held in her hands, it is proposed that there was a further figure, probably a small Eros, to her right. Her raised left leg encourages one to suspect that there was a column base or a larger construction like a pillar here. Her hair is gathered behind her head and is crowned by a tiara.

The front of the 37.6 cm high figure was formed in a mold and then reworked, while the rear received less attention. The folds of skin on the neck were traced with a sharp edge. Her pupils are indicated by slight indentations. On the back at hip height is a large, oval hole which was added to prevent trapped air causing the statue to explode when it was fired in the kiln. It is thought that the statuette was made in Myrina in Asia Minor. This place was famed for its terracotta production, along with Tanagra in Boeotia. Since the two places reached their apogees at different times, this figure is dated to the second century BC. The figure was originally coloured. There are remains of the slipware in the creases of her drapery, blue traces on the diadem and re-red on her coat.

The statue was acquired from the collection of Maximilian von Heyl in 1930 for the Antikensammlung Berlin - from which the figure received the name by which it is now known. Since then she has been shown in the rooms of the permanent exhibition on the Altes Museum.

== Bibliography ==
- Gerhard Zimmer: "Tonfigur der Aphrodite", in: Andreas Scholl, Gertrud Platz-Horster (ed.): Altes Museum. Pergamonmuseum. Die Antikensammlung. von Zabern, Mainz 2007, ISBN 978-3-8053-2449-6, p. 113.
