= Aphrodite of Syracuse =

Statue of Venus (modest Venus)

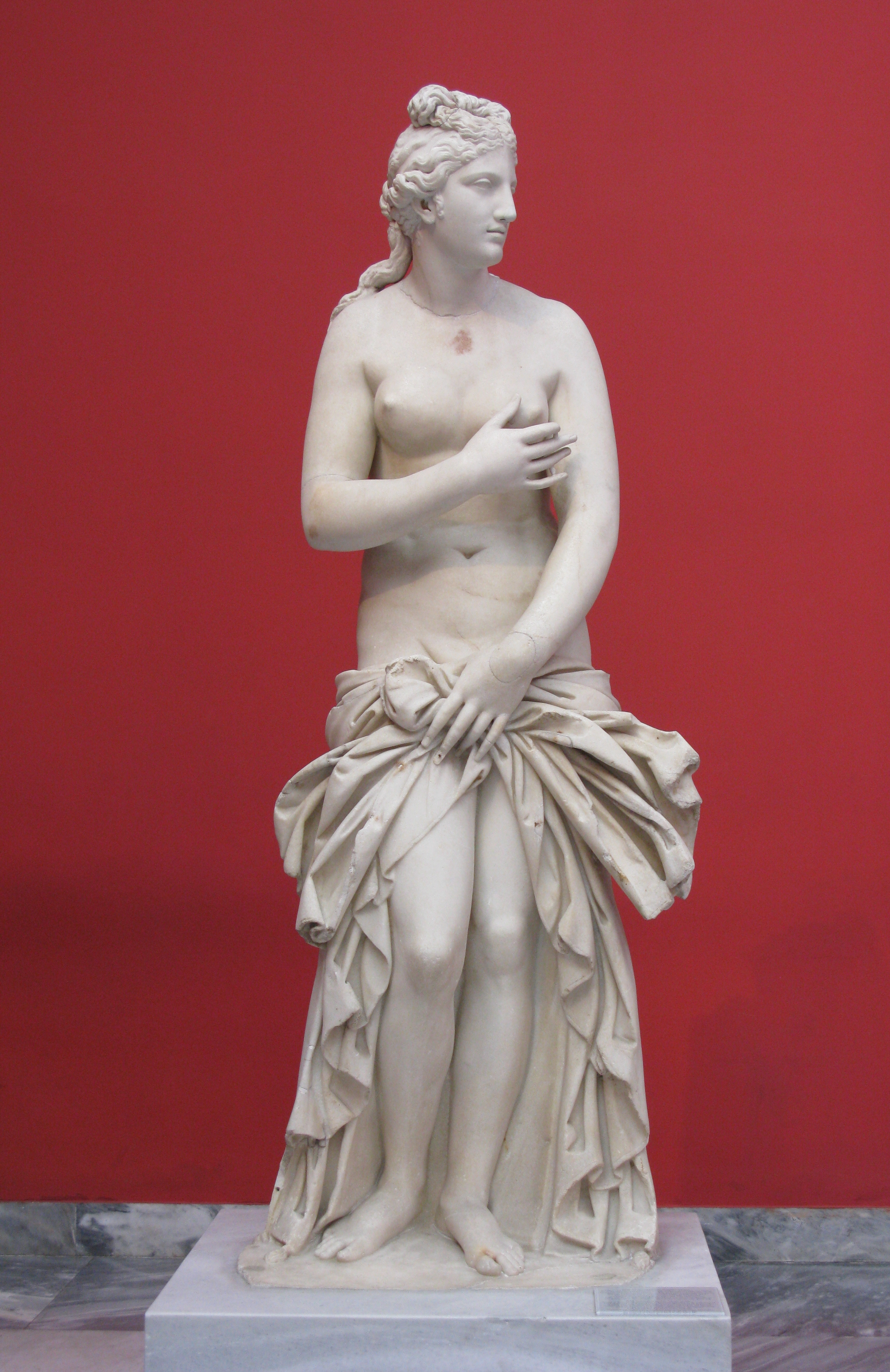
- Material: Parian marble
- Height: 180 cm (71 in)
- Created: c. 2nd century AD
- Discovered: Baiae, Campania, Italy
- Place: National Archaeological Museum of Athens, Athens, Greece

The Aphrodite of Syracuse is a statue of the Greek goddess Aphrodite in the National Archaeological Museum of Athens (NAMA) with the inventory number 3524 is dated to the second century AD.

== History ==
The statue was found in South Italian Baiae and received her name on account of the connection to Magna Graecia. It is made of Parian marble and has a height of 1.8 m. The statue initially belonged to the collection of Thomas Hope and was acquired in 1917 by Michael Embeirikos, who gave it to the National Archaeological Museum of Athens in 1924.

== Description ==
The statue was restored by the sculptor Antonio Canova, since it initially lacked head, neck and right arm. Aphrodite is depicted largely naked, with only a himation slung over her buttocks and held in place over her genitals with her left hand. The rest of the garment falls to the ground behind and beside her. The wide stream of cloth also fulfills the function of a statue support. The two feet are close together on a plinth, with the left leg made to serve as the supporting leg and the right leg as the loose one. With her right hand, the goddess attempts to cover her left breast. The head is twisted to the left. Thus the statue belongs to the Venus pudica type, which derives from a statue of the famous sculptor Praxiteles, the Aphrodite of Cnidus. The statue is a Roman copy of a Greek original.

== See also ==
- Aphrodite of Rhodes
- Aphrodite Rhithymnia
- Poseidon of Melos

== Bibliography ==
- Nikolaos Kaltsas: Sculpture in the National Archaeological Museum, Athens, The J. Paul Getty Museum, Los Angeles 2002, ISBN 0-89236-686-9, p. 256.
