= Artistic canons of body proportions =

Criteria used in formal figurative art

An artistic canon of body proportions (or aesthetic canon of proportion), in the sphere of visual arts, is a formally codified set of criteria deemed mandatory for a particular artistic style of figurative art. The word canon (from Ancient Greek κανών (kanṓn) 'measuring rod, standard') was first used for this type of rule in Classical Greece, where it set a reference standard for body proportions, to produce a harmoniously formed figure appropriate to depict gods or kings. Other art styles have similar rules that apply particularly to the representation of royal or divine personalities.

== Ancient Egypt ==
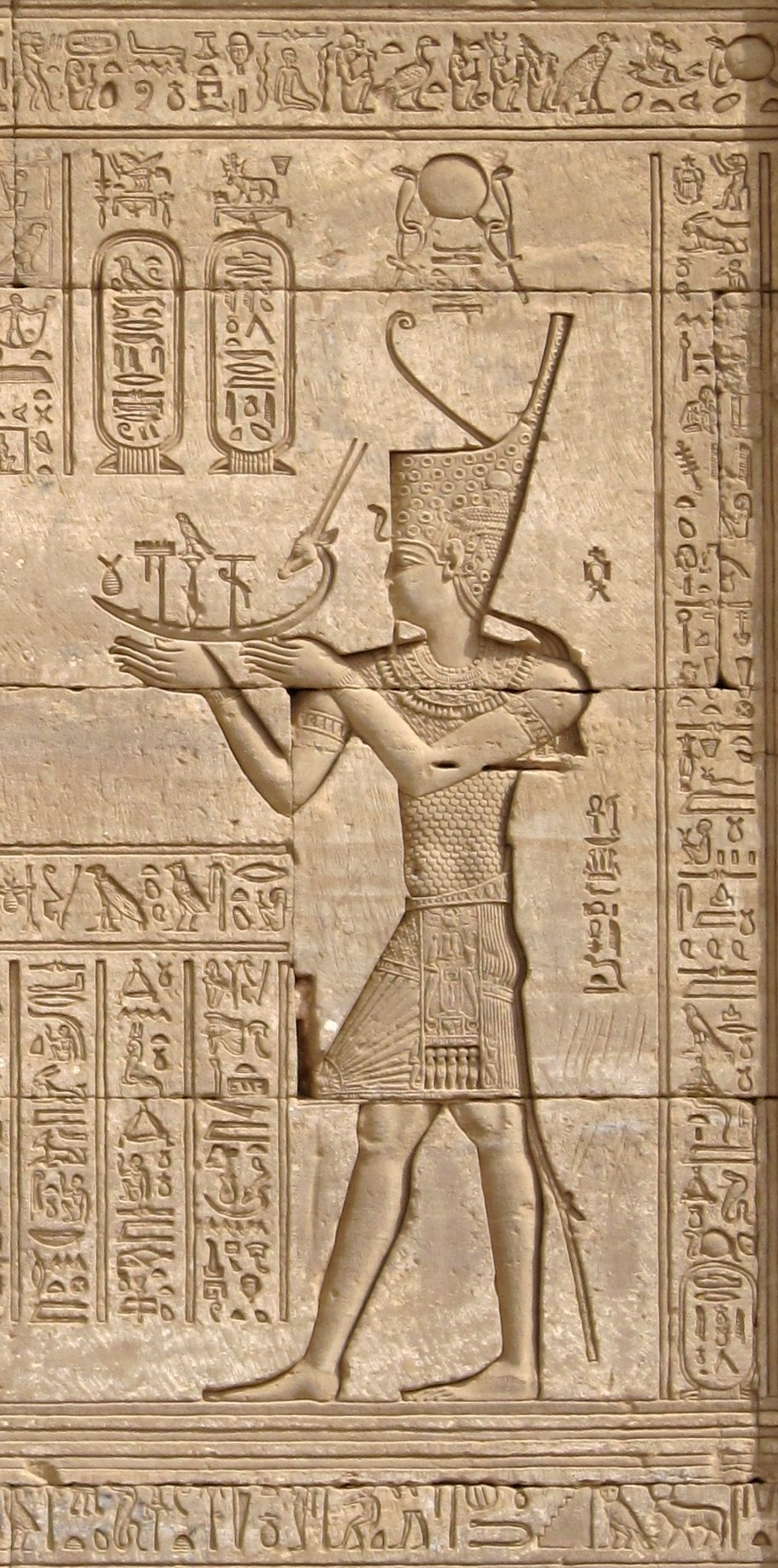
The traditional Egyptian depiction of the body in flat images. The figure represents the Roman Emperor Trajan (ruled 98–117 CE) making offerings to Egyptian Gods, Dendera Temple complex, Egypt.

In 1961, Danish Egyptologist Erik Iverson described a canon of proportions in classical Egyptian painting. This work was based on still-detectable grid lines on tomb paintings: he determined that the grid was 18 cells high, with the base-line at the soles of the feet and the top of the grid aligned with hair line, and the navel at the eleventh line. These 'cells' were specified according to the size of the subject's fist, measured across the knuckles. (Iverson attempted to find a fixed – rather than relative – size for the grid, but this aspect of his work has been dismissed by later analysts.) This proportion was already established by the Narmer Palette from about the 31st century BCE, and remained in use until at least the conquest by Alexander the Great some 3,000 years later.

The Egyptian canon for paintings and reliefs specified that heads should be shown in profile, that shoulders and chest be shown head-on, that hips and legs be again in profile, and that male figures should have one foot forward and female figures stand with feet together.

== Classical Greece ==
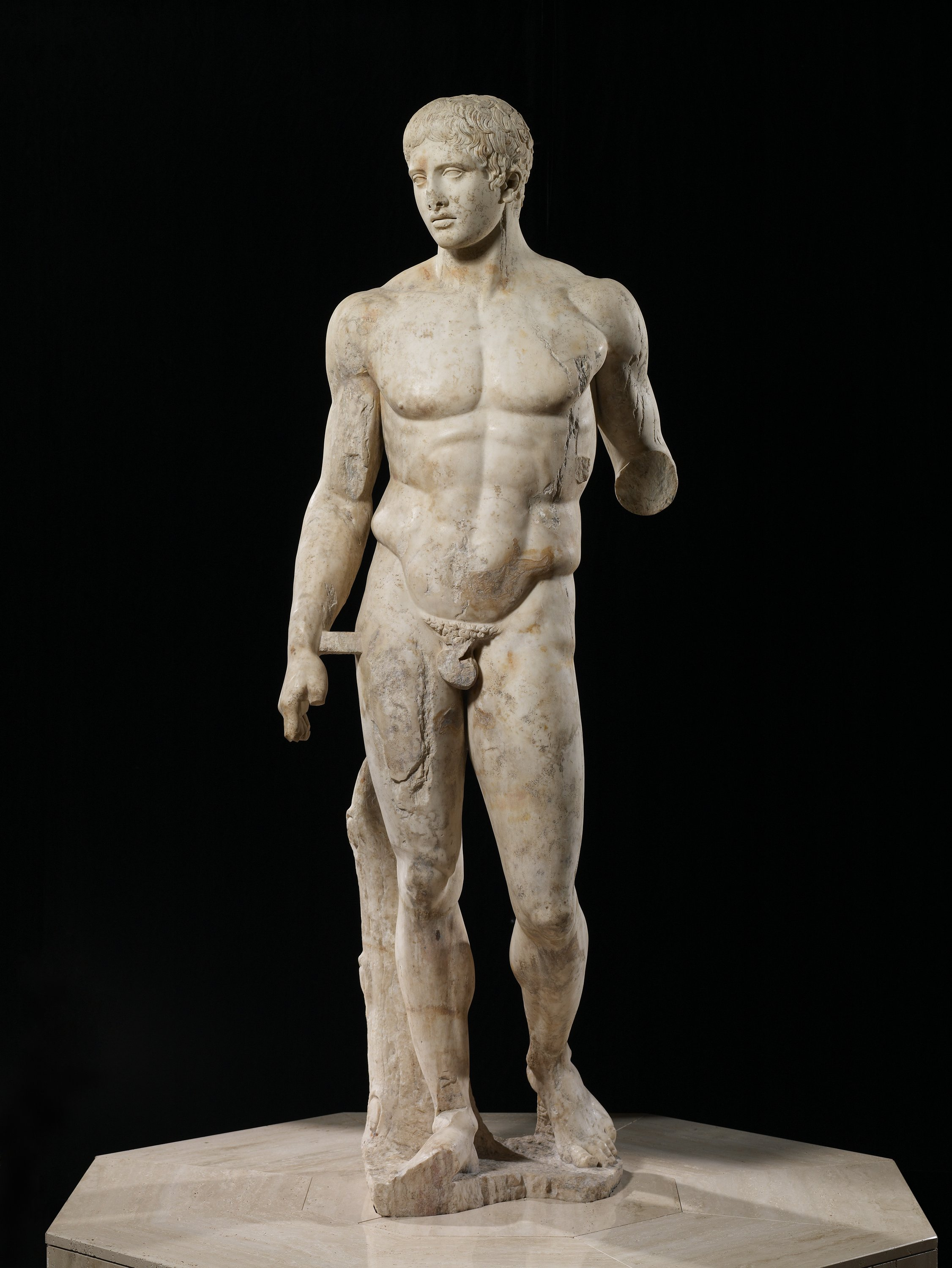
Doryphoros (Roman copy)

=== Canon of Polykleitos ===
In Classical Greece, the sculptor Polykleitos (fifth century BCE) established the Canon of Polykleitos. Though his theoretical treatise is lost to history, he is quoted as saying, "Perfection ... comes about little by little (para mikron) through many numbers". By this he meant that a statue should be composed of clearly definable parts, all related to one another through a system of ideal mathematical proportions and balance. Though the Kanon was probably represented by his Doryphoros, the original bronze statue has not survived, but later marble copies exist.

Despite the many advances made by modern scholars towards a clearer comprehension of the theoretical basis of the Canon of Polykleitos, the results of these studies show an absence of any general agreement upon the practical application of that canon in works of art. An observation on the subject by Rhys Carpenter remains valid: "Yet it must rank as one of the curiosities of our archaeological scholarship that no-one has thus far succeeded in extracting the recipe of the written canon from its visible embodiment, and compiling the commensurable numbers that we know it incorporates." (Note: Tobin's conjectured reconstruction is described at Polykleitos#Conjectured reconstruction.)

— Richard Tobin, The Canon of Polykleitos, 1975.

=== Canon of Lysippos ===
The sculptor Lysippos (fourth century BCE) developed a more gracile style. In his Historia Naturalis, Pliny the Elder wrote that Lysippos introduced a new canon into art: capita minora faciendo quam antiqui, corpora graciliora siccioraque, per qum proceritassignorum major videretur, (Note: 'he made the heads of his statues smaller than the ancients, and defined the hair especially, making the bodies more slender and sinewy by which the height of the figure seemed greater') signifying "a canon of bodily proportions essentially different from that of Polykleitos". Lysippos is credited with having established the 'eight heads high' canon of proportion.

=== Praxiteles ===
Praxiteles (fourth century BCE), sculptor of the famed Aphrodite of Knidos, is credited with having thus created a canonical form for the female nude, but neither the original work nor any of its ratios survive. Academic study of later Roman copies (and in particular modern restorations of them) suggest that they are artistically and anatomically inferior to the original.

== Byzantine art ==
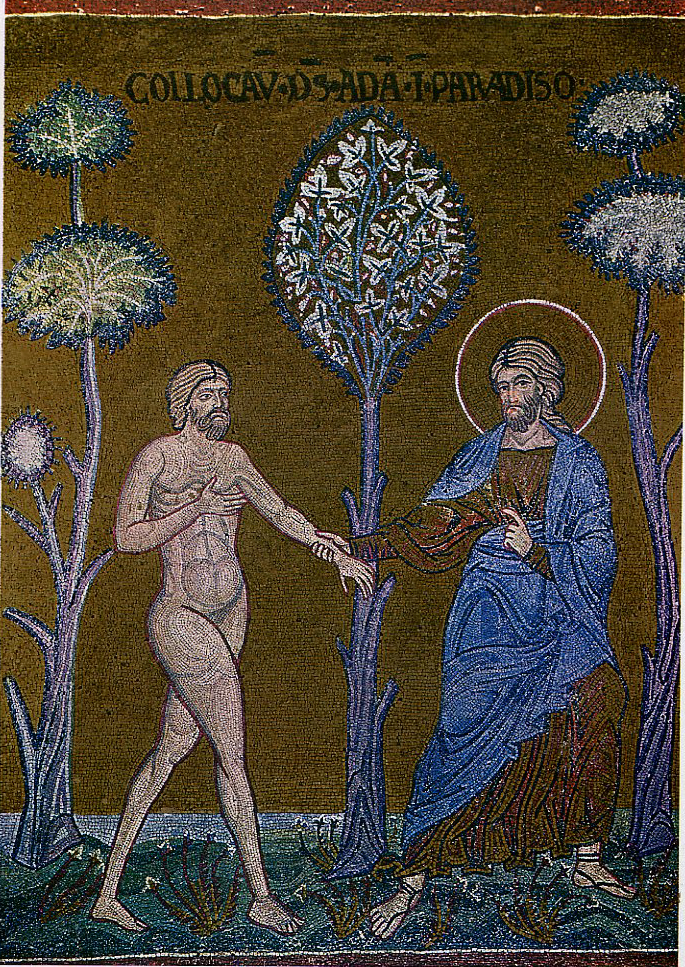
Adam with God the Father (here depicted as Jesus following Colossians 1:15 and also due to theological issues), mosaic from Monreale Cathedral in Palermo, symbolizing the enduring influence of Byzantine Italy within the culture of Norman Sicily.

Dionysios of Fourna, a Greek Orthodox monk based in Mount Athos, describes in his Painter's Manual the following body canon with respect to which all adult male figures were drawn in the icons of Eastern Orthodoxy following Byzantine models.

Learn, O Pupil, that the whole figure of a man there are nine faces, that us to say nine measures, from the forehead to the soles of the feet. First make the face first, which you divide into three, making the first division the forehead, the second the nose and the third the beard. Draw the hair above the face to the height of one nose-length; again measure into thirds the distance between the beard and the nose; the chin takes up two of the divisions and the mouth one, while the throat is one nose length. Next divide from the chin to the middle of the body into three measures, and from there to the knees two more; for each knee ypu take one nose-length. Take again two more measures to the ankle bones, and from there to the soles of the feet one more nose-length, and from there to the toenails one more measure. From the pit of the throat to the shoulder is one measure, and Likewise to the other shoulder. For the thickness of the upper arm take one nose-length and measure to the elbow from above one measure, and again one more to the base of the hand; from there to the fingertips is one more measure. Both the eyes are equal, and the distance separating them is equal to one eye. When the head is in profile the nose and the ears are the length of two eyes apart, and when it is full face you put them one eye's length apart; the ear should be equal to the nose. When a man is naked his waist should be four nose-lengths across, and when he is clothed, one and a half faces. The girdle should be in the middle of the body, at the point to which the elbows reach.

— The Painter's Manual, (English translation by Paul Hetherington)

== Renaissance Italy ==
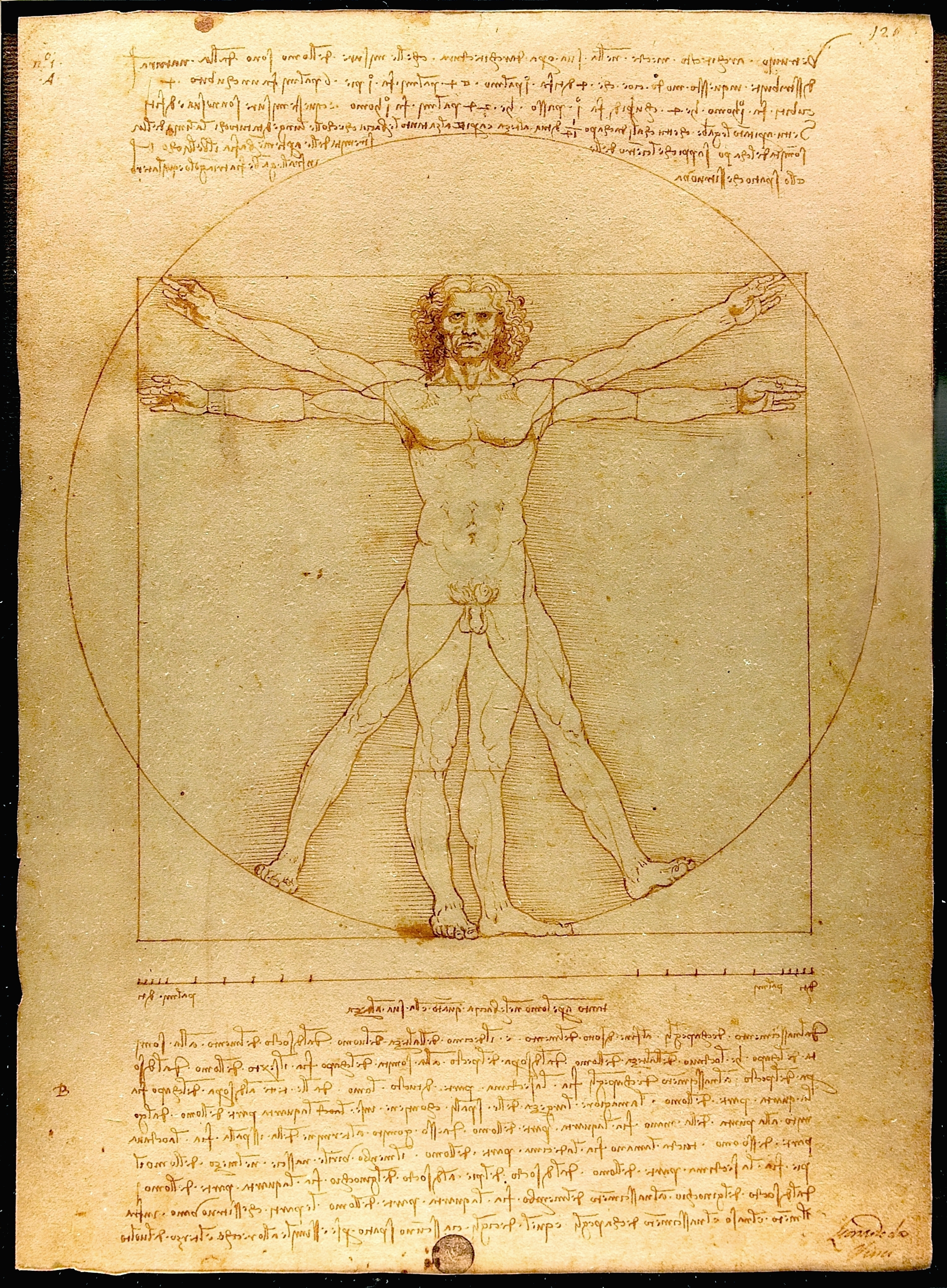
Vitruvian Man by Leonardo da Vinci

Other such systems of 'ideal proportions' in painting and sculpture include Leonardo da Vinci's Vitruvian Man, based on a record of body proportions made by the architect Vitruvius, in the third book of his series De architectura. Rather than setting a canon of ideal body proportions for others to follow, Vitruvius sought to identify the proportions that exist in reality; Leonardo idealised these proportions in the commentary that accompanies his drawing:

The length of the outspread arms is equal to the height of a man; from the hairline to the bottom of the chin is one-tenth of the height of a man; from below the chin to the top of the head is one-eighth of the height of a man; from above the chest to the top of the head is one-sixth of the height of a man; from above the chest to the hairline is one-seventh of the height of a man. The maximum width of the shoulders is a quarter of the height of a man; from the breasts to the top of the head is a quarter of the height of a man; the distance from the elbow to the tip of the hand is a quarter of the height of a man; the distance from the elbow to the armpit is one-eighth of the height of a man; the length of the hand is one-tenth of the height of a man; the root of the penis is at half the height of a man; the foot is one-seventh of the height of a man; from below the foot to below the knee is a quarter of the height of a man; from below the knee to the root of the penis is a quarter of the height of a man; the distances from below the chin to the nose and the eyebrows and the hairline are equal to the ears and to one-third of the face. (Note: Translation by Wikipedia editor, copied from Vetruvian Man)

== Classical India ==
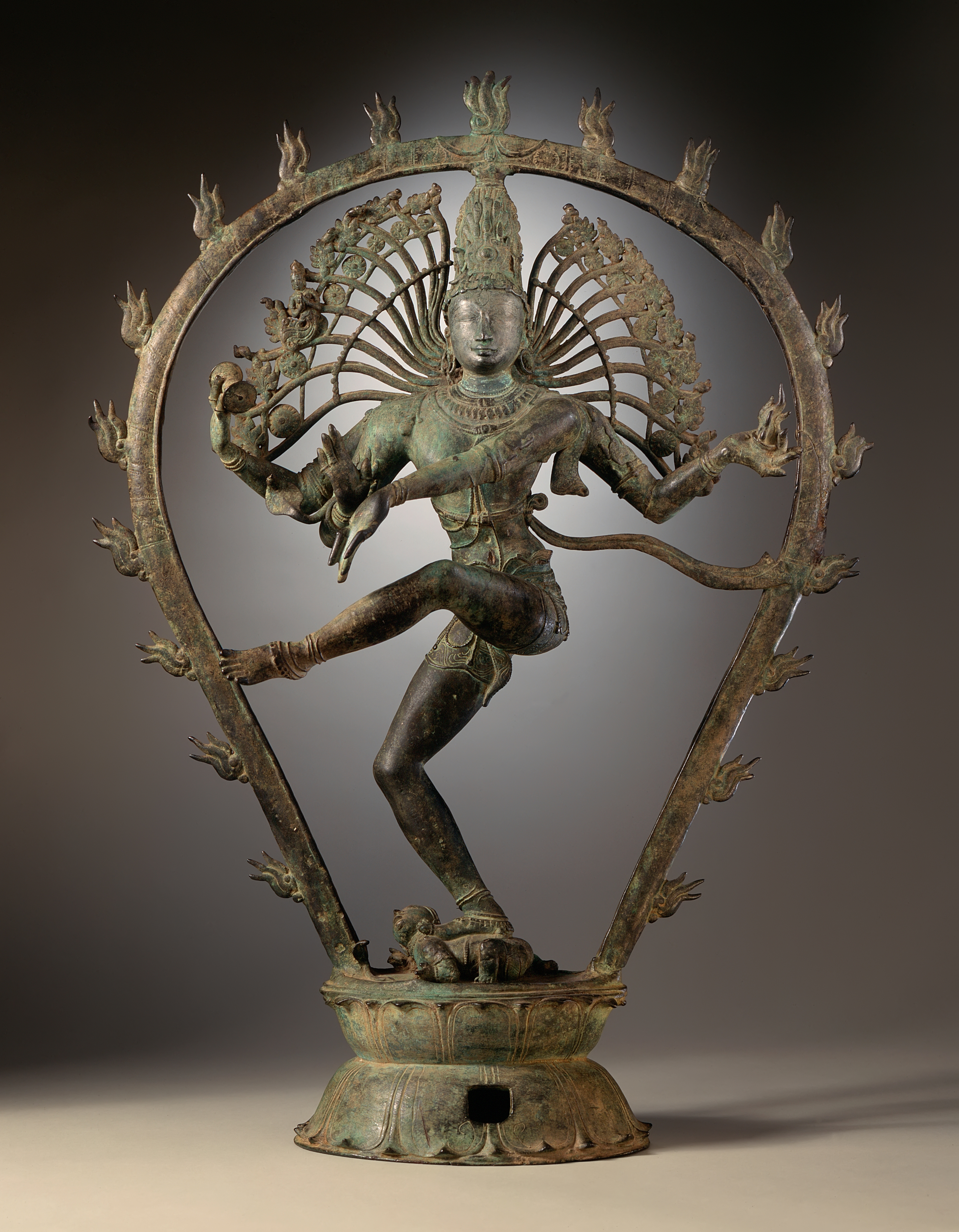
Shiva as Nataraja (the Lord of Dance)

Various canons are set out in the Shilpa Shastras.

There are different sets of proportions given in the Hindu Āgamas for the making of images. Each of these varies with the subject; for example, images of the three Supreme deities, Bramā, Vishnu and Śiva are required to be formed according to the set of proportions collectively called the uttama-daśa-tāla measurement; similarly, the malhyama-daśa-tāla is prescribed for images of the principal Śaktis (goddesses), Lakshmi, Bhūmi, Durgā, Pārvati and Sarasvati: the pancha-tāla, for making the figure of Gaṇapati, and the chatus-tāla for the figures of children and of deformed and dwarfed men. The term tāla literally means the palm of the hand, and by implication is a measure of length equal to that between the tip of the middle finger and the end of the palm near the wrist. This length is in all instances taken to be equal to the length of the face from the scalp to the chin. It is therefore usual to measure the total length in terms of the length of the face rather than in terms of the palm of the hand. This practice is followed also in the succeeding paragraphs. The reader would be inclined to believe that the phrases daśa-tāla, paṅcha-tāla and ēkatāl mean lengths equal to ten, five and one tāla respectively, but unfortunately this interpretation does not seem to agree with the actual measurements; for example, the total length of an image made according to the Uttama-daśa-ālc measurement is 124 aṅgulas, and the tāla of this image measures 13 aṅgulas; dividing the total length by the length of the tāla we find that there are only 9 tāla in it; again, the total length of a chatus-tāla image is 48 aṅgulas and its tāla is 8 aṅgulas and therefore there are 6 tālas in this set of proportions. Thus it is found that there is no etymological significance clearly visible in the names given to the various proportions.

— T. A. Gopinatha Rao

The artist does not choose his own problems: he finds in the canon instruction to make such and such images in such and such [a] fashion - for example, an image of Nataraja with four arms, of Brahma with four heads, of Mahisha-Mardini with ten arms, or Ganesa with an elephant’s head.

— Ananda K. Coomaraswamy

It is in drawing from the life that a canon is likely to be a hindrance to the artist; but it is not the method of Indian art to work from the model. Almost the whole philosophy of Indian art is summed up in the verse of Śukrācārya's Śukranĩtisāra which enjoins meditations upon the imager: "In order that the form of an image may be brought fully and clearly before the mind, the imager should medi[t]ate; and his success will be proportionate to his meditation. No other way—not indeed seeing the object itself—will achieve his purpose." The canon then, is of use as a rule of thumb, relieving him of some part of the technical difficulties, leaving him free to concentrate his thought more singly on the message or burden of his work. It is only in this way that it must have been used in periods of great achievement, or by great artists.

— Ananda K. Coomaraswamy

== Tibet ==
A 20th century unfinished thangka depicting Avalokiteshwara at the Tibet Museum of Lhasa

Owning to the importance of visualisation of divine forms in Tibetan Buddhism, Tibetan art has developed a sophisticated form of iconometry described in the Buddhist tantric literature, borrowing much of its concepts from the Hindu shilpa-shastras. A significant controversy in this matter was the regarding the body proportions of the Buddha as the Kalachakra Tantra prescribed a proportion based on 125 sor (Tibetan translation for the Sanskrit angula) while the Samvarodaya Tantra mentioned a variant measurement based on 120 sor. The 6th Dalai Lama had decreed in favour of the latter, which although being widespread at the time, was deemed controversial. In response Zhuchen Tsultrim Rinchen (1697-1774), the famous editor of Derge Kangyur and Tengyur who came from a long-line of thangka-painters in Kham, compiled a definitive canon of artistic proportions regarding the Buddha, the bodhisattvas, wrathful deities and humans using Sanskrit and Tibetan sources. Zhuchen's iconometric proportions were based on the works of the 15th century Tibetan artist, Mantangpa Menla Dondrub, progenitor of the Menri style of Tibetan art.

== Japan ==
=== Canon of Jōchō ===
Jōchō (定朝; died 1057 CE), also known as Jōchō Busshi, was a Japanese sculptor of the Heian period. He popularised the yosegi technique of sculpting a single figure out of many pieces of wood, and he redefined the canon of body proportions used to create Japanese Buddhist imagery. He based the measurements on a unit equal to the distance between the sculpted figure's chin and hairline. The distance between each knee (in the seated lotus pose) is equal to the distance from the bottoms of the legs to the hair.

== Other measurements ==
Andrew Loomis's method, from Figure Drawing for All It's Worth (p28)

=== Contemporary (head-based) method ===
In the system recommended by Andrew Loomis, an idealized human body is eight heads tall, the torso being three heads and the legs another four; a more realistically proportioned body, he suggests, is closer to seven-and-a-half heads tall, the difference being in the length of the legs. He additionally recommends head-based proportions for children of varying ages, and as means of producing different effects in adult bodies (e.g. a "heroic" body is nine heads tall).

== See also ==
- Academic art – Style of painting and sculpture
- Anthropic units – Academic term in archaeology, social studies and measurement
- Beauty – Characteristic that provides pleasure or satisfaction
- Canon (basic principle), a rule or a body of rules or principles generally established as valid and fundamental in a field of art or philosophy
  - Western canon – Cultural classics valued in the West
- Chibi (style) – Japanese anime art style with exaggerated proportions
- Figurative art – Art that depicts real object sources
- Modulor – Le Corbusier's anthropometric scale of proportions
- Nudity – State of humans wearing no clothing
  - Depictions of nudity – Visual representations of the nude human form
  - Nude (art) – Artwork focused on the unclothed human body
- Neoclassicism – Western cultural movement
- Physical attractiveness – Aesthetic assessment of physical traits
