= Asopodorus =

Ancient Greek sculptor

Asopodorus (Ancient Greek: Ἀσωπόδωρος) was a sculptor of Ancient Greece, possibly a native of Argos. According to Pliny the Elder, he was a pupil of the renowned Polykleitos.
