= Athenodoros of Cleitor =

Ancient Greek sculptor

Athenodoros (Ancient Greek: Ἀθηνόδωρος) of Cleitor in Arcadia was an ancient Greek sculptor. He lived around the 5th century BCE.

Athenodoros executed statues of the Greek mythological gods Zeus and Apollo, which were dedicated by the Spartans at Delphi after the Battle of Aegospotami. He was also famed for his statues of distinguished women. He was a pupil of the renowned sculptor Polykleitos. He was one of the artist's seven apprentices, who constituted a cluster that is said to share and propagate a certain artistic tradition. Particularly, Athenodoros and Demeas, a fellow apprentice from Cleitor, were identified as brass-casters.
