= Discophoros =

Sculpture by Polyclitus (athlete with discus)

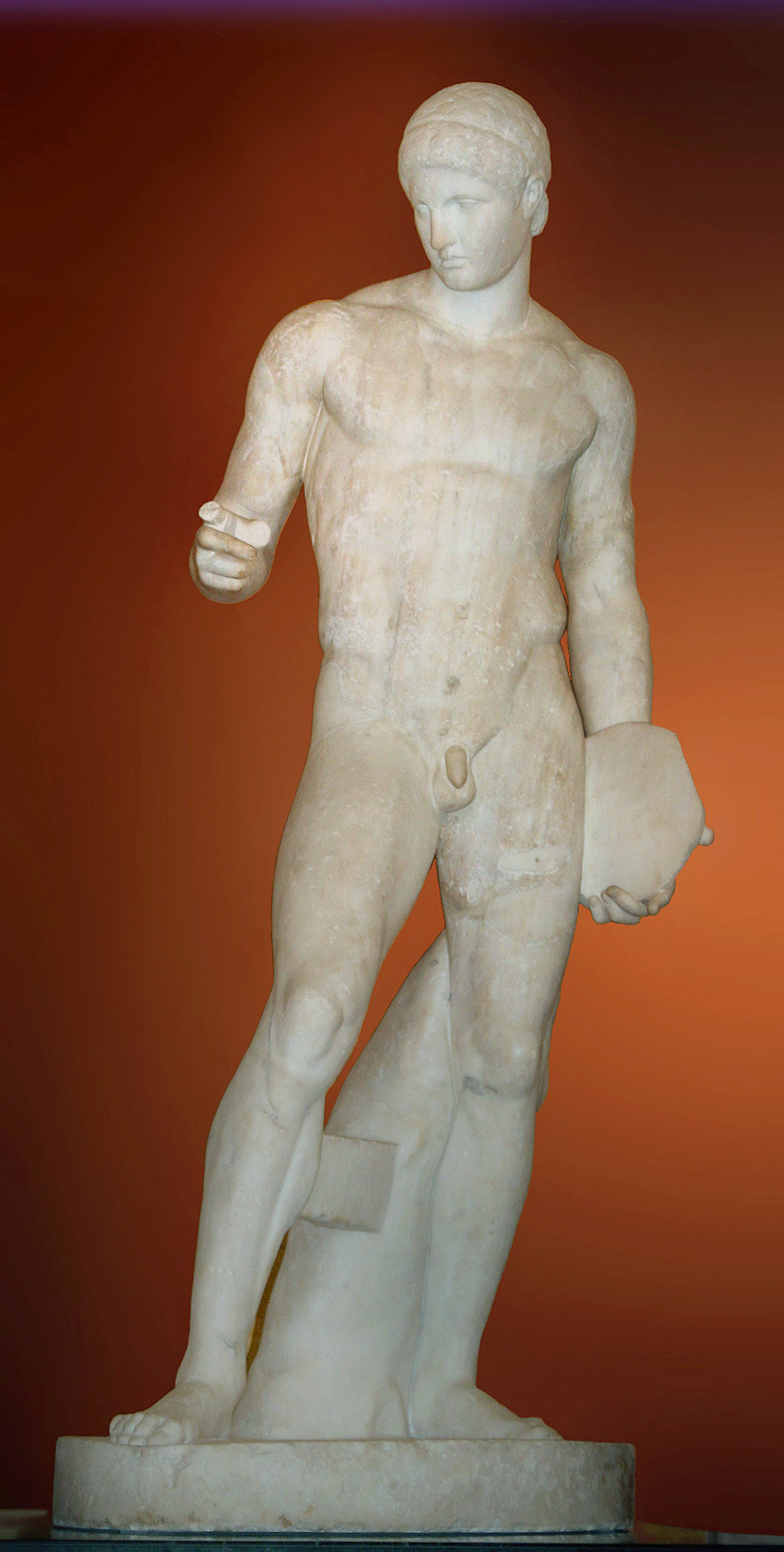
The Townley Discophoros (British Museum)

The Discophoros, also spelled Discophorus (Greek – "Discus-Bearer"), was a bronze sculpture by the classical Greek sculptor Polyclitus, which is known today through many Roman marble copies. It is not to be confused with Discobolus of Myron, which shows a discus being thrown, not carried.

Like his Doryphoros and Diadumenos, it was created as an example of Polyclitus's "canon" of the ideal human form in sculpture. It features a young, muscular, solidly-built athlete in a moment of thought before throwing a discus. Most marble copies feature the addition of a marble tree stump, as marble is weaker but heavier than bronze and the stump is needed for support. These copies are also often missing their arms, which are often restored.

There are variant in the Louvre Museum (Paris) and the Capitoline Museums (Rome).

== Gallery ==
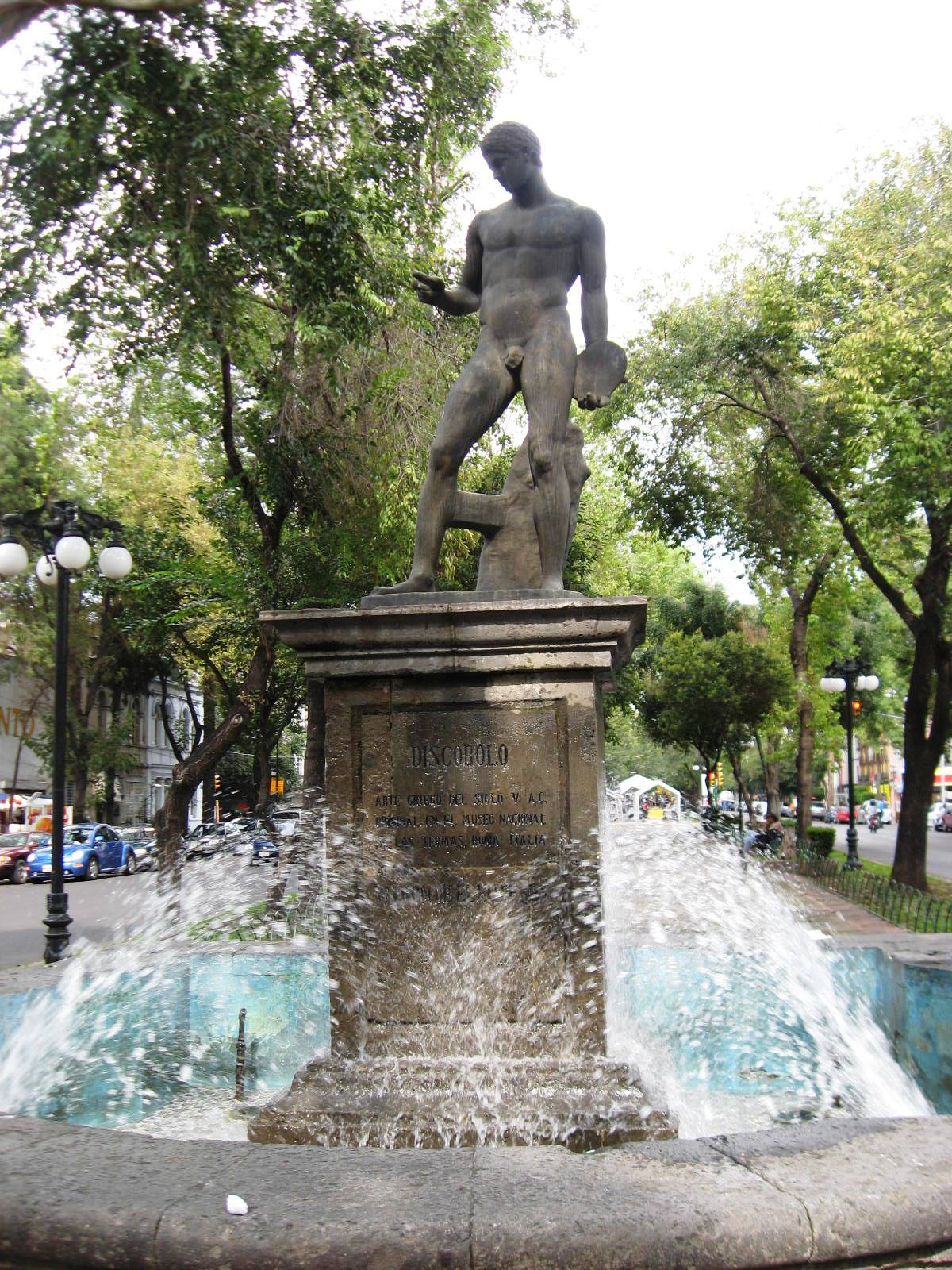
Discophorus fountain, on Calle Obregon in Colonia Roma in Mexico City

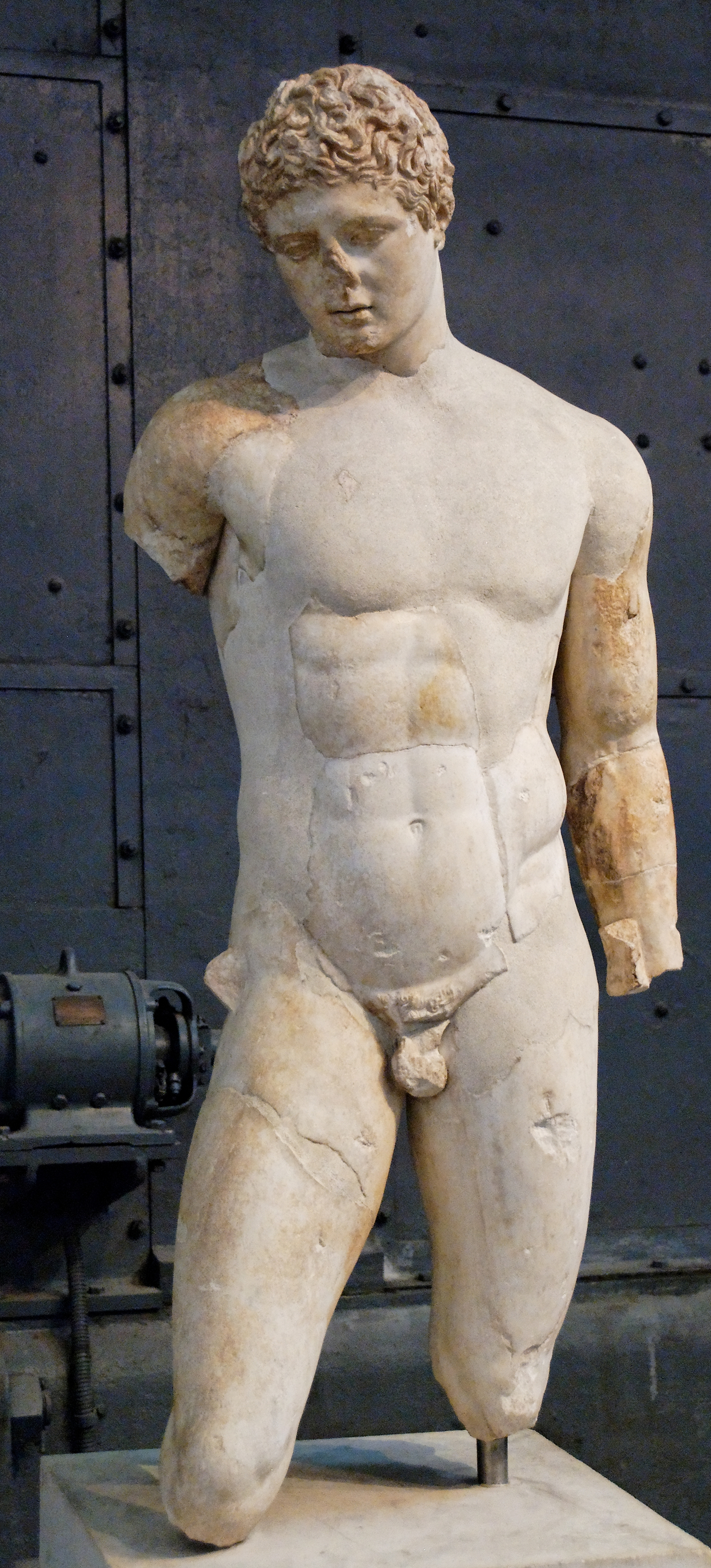
A variant, found in via del Mare, 1910 (Capitoline Museums)

== See also ==
- Discobolus
