= Polykleitos =

Fifth century BCE Greek sculptor

- Born: Πολύκλειτος (Ancient Greek); Argos, Greece
- Died: c. 420 BCE; Argos, Greece
- Notable work: Doryphoros, Diadumenos, Discophoros
- Style: Classical Greek art
- Patrons: Argos; Olympia

Polykleitos (/ˌpɔːliˈklaɪtoʊs/; Ancient Greek: Πολύκλειτος) was an ancient Greek sculptor, active in the 5th century BCE. Alongside the Athenian sculptors Pheidias, Myron and Praxiteles, he is considered as one of the most important sculptors of classical antiquity. The 4th century BCE catalogue attributed to Xenocrates (the "Xenocratic catalogue"), which was Pliny's guide in matters of art, ranked him between Pheidias and Myron. He is particularly known for his lost treatise, the Canon of Polykleitos (a canon of body proportions), which set out his mathematical basis of an idealised male body shape.

None of his original sculptures are known to survive, but many marble works, mostly Roman, are believed to be later copies.

== Name ==
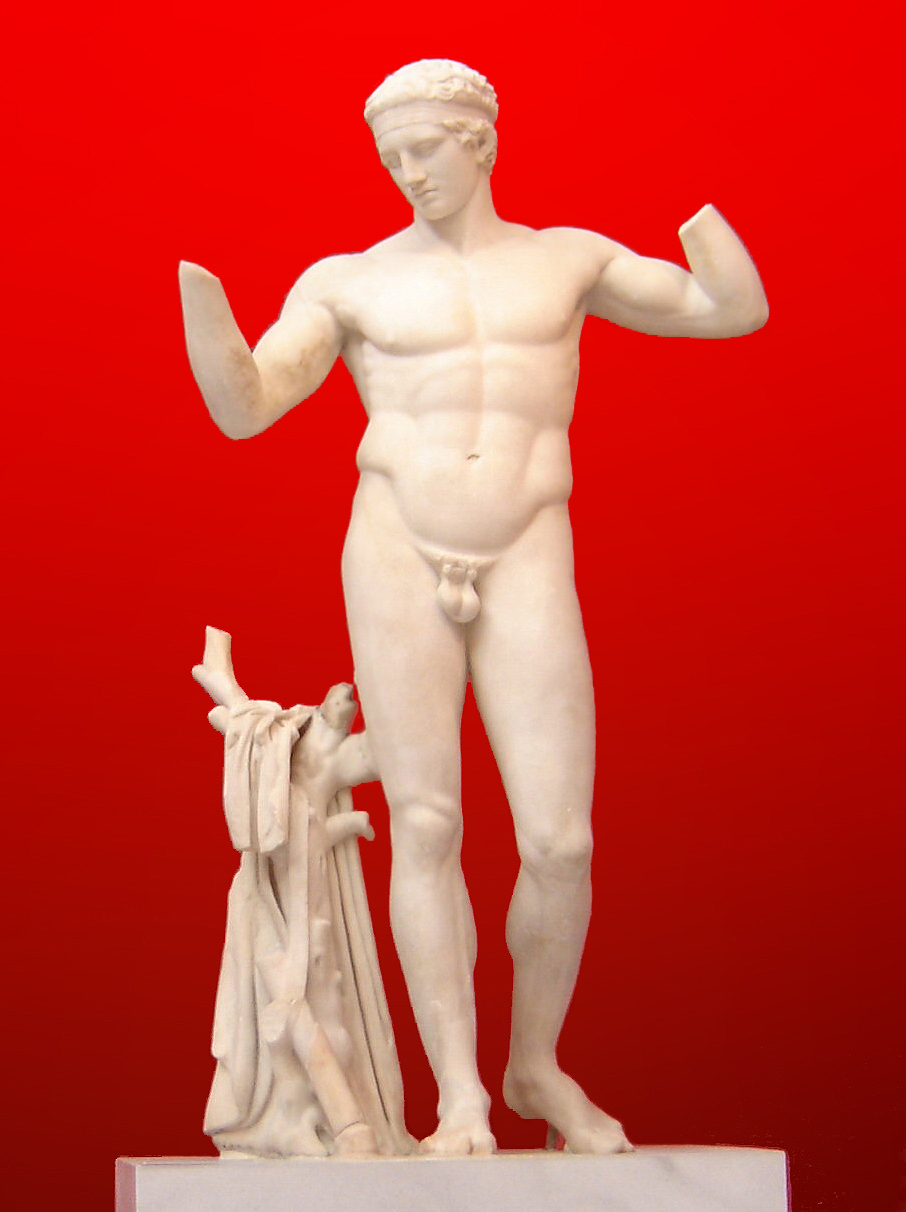
A Polykleitan Diadumenos, in a Roman marble copy, National Archaeological Museum of Athens

His Greek name was traditionally Latinized Polycletus, but is also transliterated Polycleitus (Ancient Greek: Πολύκλειτος [polýkleːtos], "much-renowned") and, due to iotacism in the transition from Ancient to Modern Greek, Polyklitos or Polyclitus. He is called Sicyonius (lit. "The Sicyonian", usually translated as "of Sicyon") by Latin authors including Pliny the Elder and Cicero, and Ἀργεῖος (lit. "The Argive", trans. "of Argos") by others like Plato and Pausanias. He is sometimes called the Elder, in cases where it is necessary to distinguish him from his son, who is regarded as a major architect but a minor sculptor.

== Early life and training ==
As noted above, Polykleitos is called "The Sicyonian" by some authors, all writing in Latin, and who modern scholars view as relying on an error of Pliny the Elder in conflating another more minor sculptor from Sikyon, a disciple of Phidias, with Polykleitos of Argos. Pausanias is adamant that they were not the same person, and that Polykleitos was from Argos, in which city state he must have received his early training, (Note: That a "school of Argos" existed during the fifth century is minimized as "marginal" by Jeffery M. Hurwit, "The Doryphoros: Looking Backward", in Warren G. Moon, ed. Polykleitos, the Doryphoros, and Tradition, 1995:3-18.) and a contemporary of Phidias (possibly also taught by Ageladas).

== Works ==
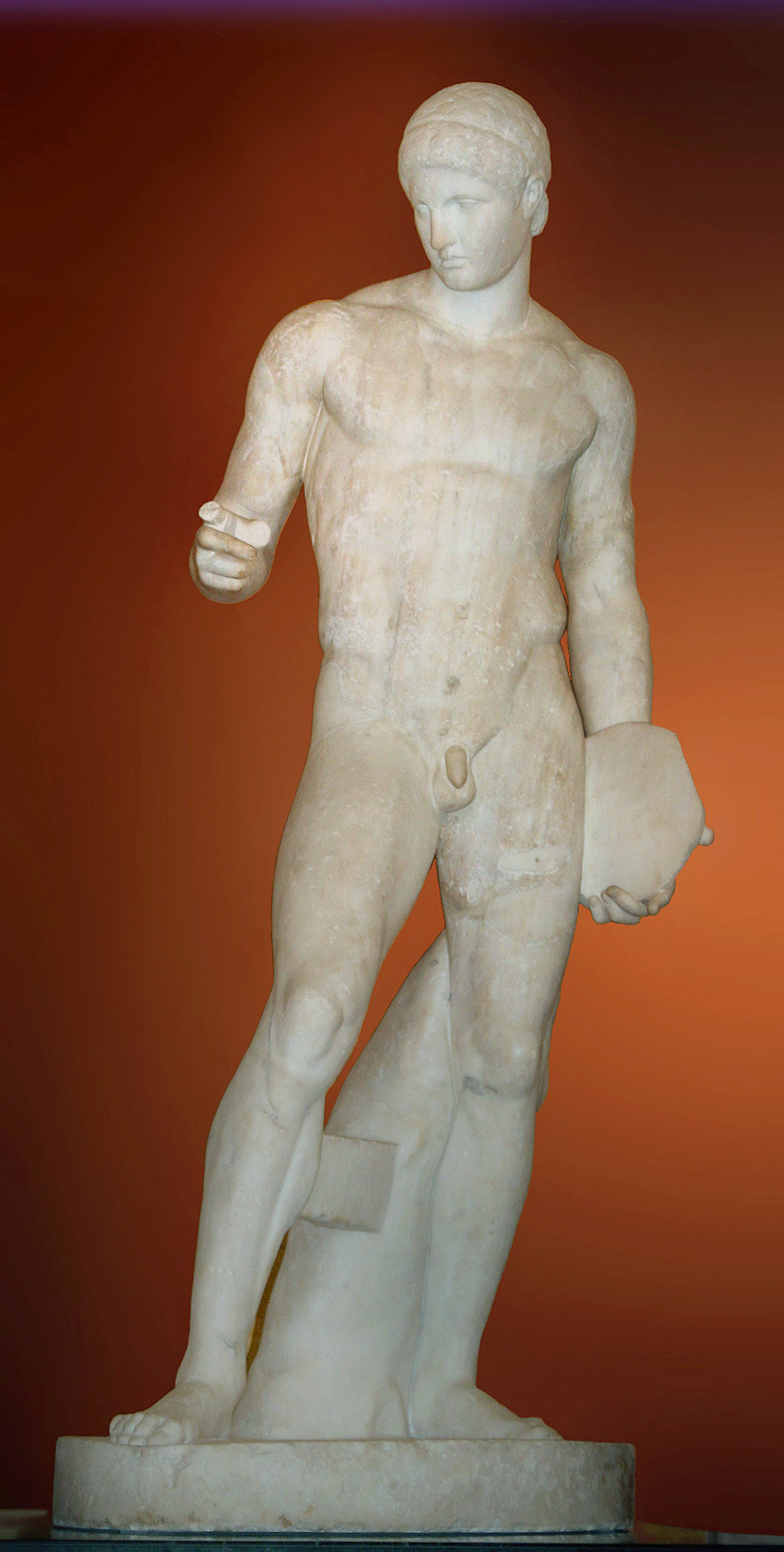
The Townley Marbles Discophoros, British Museum

Polykleitos's figure of an Amazon for Ephesus was admired, while his colossal gold and ivory statue of Hera which stood in her temple—the Heraion of Argos—was favourably compared with the Olympian Zeus by Pheidias. He also sculpted a famous bronze male nude known as the Doryphoros ("Spear Bearer"), which survives in the form of numerous Roman marble copies. Further sculptures attributed to Polykleitos are the Discophoros ("Discus-bearer"), Diadumenos ("Youth tying a headband") and a Hermes at one time placed, according to Pliny, in Lysimachia (Thrace). Polykleitos's Astragalizontes ("Boys Playing at Knuckle-bones") was claimed by the Emperor Titus and set in a place of honour in his atrium. Pliny also mentions that Polykleitos was one of the five major sculptors who competed in the fifth century B.C. to make a wounded Amazon for the temple of Artemis; marble copies associated with the competition survive.

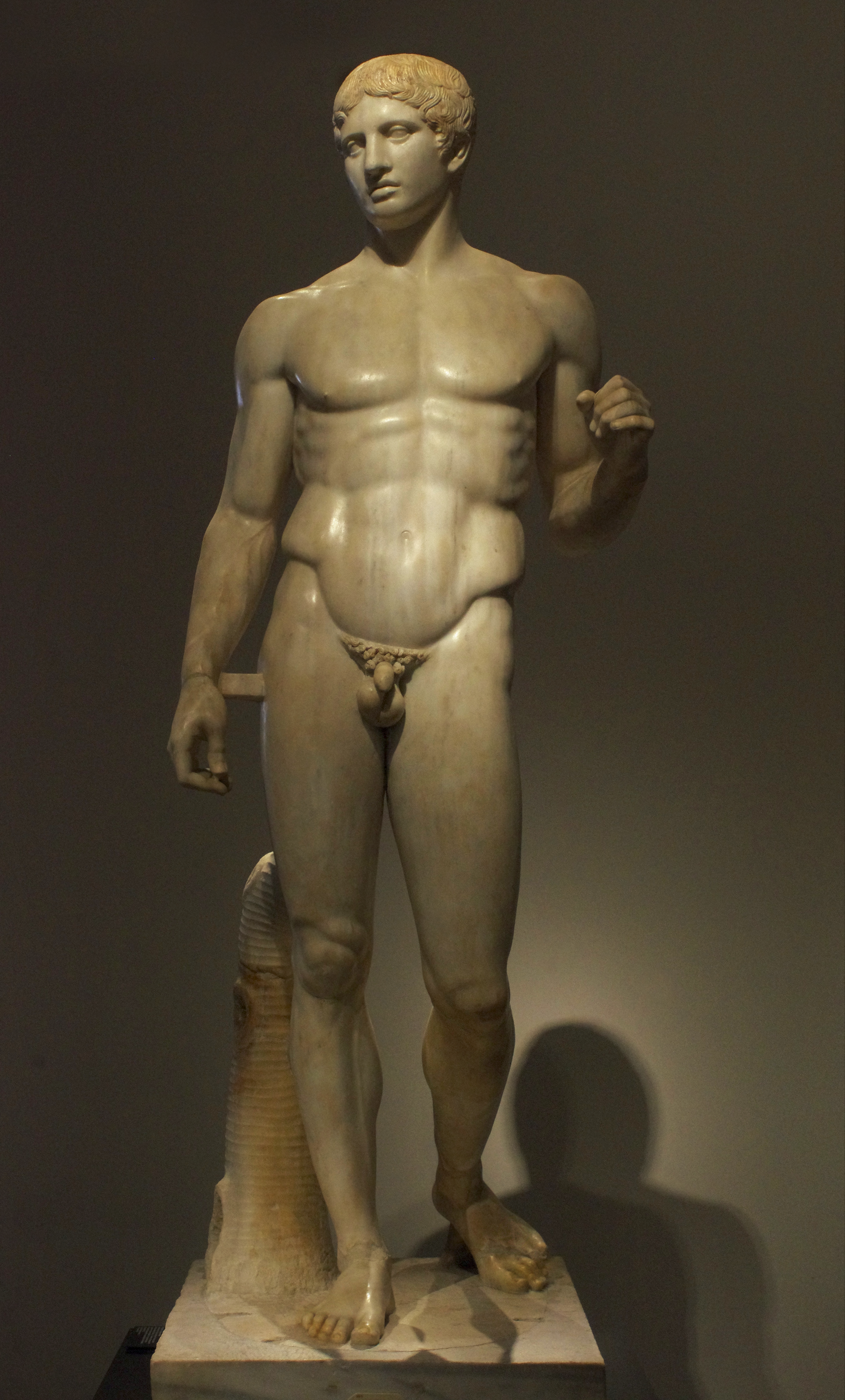
Polykleitos's Doryphoros, an early example of classical contrapposto. Roman marble copy in the National Archaeological Museum, Naples

=== Diadumenos ===
The statue of Diadumenos, also known as Youth Tying a Headband, is one of Polykleitos's sculptures known from many copies. The gesture of the boy tying his headband represents a victory, possibly from an athletic contest. "It is a first-century A.D. Roman copy of a Greek bronze original dated around 430 B.C." Polykleitos sculpted the outline of his muscles significantly to show that he is an athlete. "The thorax and pelvis of the Diadoumenos tilt in opposite directions, setting up rhythmic contrasts in the torso that create an impression of organic vitality. The position of the feet poised between standing and walking give a sense of potential movement. This rigorously calculated pose, which is found in almost all works attributed to Polykleitos, became a standard formula used in Greco-Roman and, later, western European art."

=== Doryphoros ===
Another statue created by Polykleitos is the Doryphoros, also called the Spear bearer. It is a typical Greek sculpture depicting the beauty of the male body. "Polykleitos sought to capture the ideal proportions of the human figure in his statues and developed a set of aesthetic principles governing these proportions that was known as the Canon or 'Rule'. He created the system based on mathematical ratios. "Though we do not know the exact details of Polykleitos’s formula, the end result, as manifested in the Doryphoros, was the perfect expression of what the Greeks called symmetria. On this sculpture, it shows somewhat of a contrapposto pose; the body is leaning most on the right leg. The Doryphoros has an idealized body, contains less of naturalism. In his left hand, there was once a spear, but if so it has since been lost. The posture of the body shows that he is a warrior and a hero. Indeed, some have gone so far as to suggest that the figure depicted was Achilles, on his way to the Trojan War, as a similar depiction of Achilles carrying a shield is seen on a vase painted by the Achilles Painter at around the same time.

== Style ==
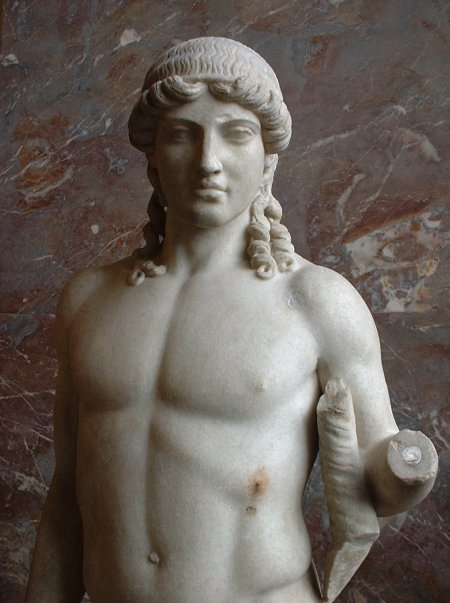
Apollo of the "Mantua type", marble Roman copy after a 5th-century-BC Greek original attributed to Polykleitos, Musée du Louvre

Polykleitos, along with Phidias, created the Classical Greek style. Although none of his original works survive, literary sources identifying Roman marble copies of his work allow reconstructions to be made. Contrapposto, a pose that visualizes the shifting balance of the body as weight is placed on one leg, was a source of his fame.

The refined detail of Polykleitos's models for casting executed in clay is revealed in a famous remark repeated in Plutarch's Moralia, that "the work is hardest when the clay is under the fingernail".

== The Canon of Polykleitos and "symmetria" ==
Polykleitos consciously created a new approach to sculpture, writing a treatise (an artistic canon (from Ancient Greek Κανών (Kanṓn) 'measuring rod, standard') and designing a male nude exemplifying his theory of the mathematical basis of ideal proportions. Though his theoretical treatise is lost to history, he is quoted as saying, "Perfection ... comes about little by little (para mikron) through many numbers". By this he meant that a statue should be composed of clearly definable parts, all related to one another through a system of ideal mathematical proportions and balance. Though his Canon was probably represented by his Doryphoros, the original bronze statue has not survived, but later marble copies exist.

References to the Kanon by other ancient writers imply that its main principle was expressed by the Greek words symmetria, the Hippocratic principle of isonomia ("equilibrium"), and rhythmos. Galen wrote that Polykleitos's Kanon "got its name because it had a precise commensurability (symmetria) of all the parts to one another." He also wrote that the Kanon defines beauty "in the proportions, not of the elements, but of the parts, that is to say, of finger to finger, and of all the fingers to the palm and the wrist, and of these to the forearm, and of the forearm to the upper arm, and of all the other parts to each other."

The art historian Kenneth Clark observed that "[Polykleitos's] general aim was clarity, balance, and completeness; his sole medium of communication the naked body of an athlete, standing poised between movement and repose".

=== Conjectured reconstruction ===
Illustration of the phalanges of a human hand

Despite the many advances made by modern scholars towards a clearer comprehension of the theoretical basis of the Canon of Polykleitos, the results of these studies show an absence of any general agreement upon the practical application of that canon in works of art. An observation on the subject by Rhys Carpenter remains valid: "Yet it must rank as one of the curiosities of our archaeological scholarship that no-one has thus far succeeded in extracting the recipe of the written canon from its visible embodiment, and compiling the commensurable numbers that we know it incorporates."

— Richard Tobin, The Canon of Polykleitos, 1975.

In a 1975 paper, art historian Richard Tobin (Note: Richard Tobin holds a doctorate in Art History from Bryn Mawr College. Since April 2016, he is director of Harwood Museum of Art at the University of New Mexico.) suggested that earlier work to reconstruct the Canon had failed because previous researchers had made a flawed assumption of a foundation in linear ratios rather than areal proportion. He conjectured that the Canon begins from the length of the outermost part (the "distal phalange") of the little finger. The length of the diagonal of a square of this side (mathematically, √2, about 1.4142) gives the length of the middle phalange. Repeating the process gives the length of the proximal phalange; doing so again gives the length of the metacarpal plus the carpal bones – the distance from knuckle to the head of the ulna. Next, a square of side equal to the length of the hand from little finger to wrist yields a diagonal of length equal to that of the forearm. This "diagonal of a square" process gives the relative ratios of many other key reference distances in the human male body. The process would not require measurement of square roots: the artist could take a long cord and make knots separated from each other by a distance which equals the diagonal of the square drawn on the preceding length. On the body proper, the process is repeated but the geometric progression is taken and retaken from the top of the head (rather than additively, as on the hand/arm): the head from crown to chin is the same size as the fore-arm; from crown to clavicle is as long as the upper arm; a diagonal on that square yields the distance from the crown to the line of the nipples. Tobin validated his calculation by comparing his theoretical model with a Roman copy of Doryphoros in the National Archaeological Museum of Naples.

== Followers ==
Polykleitos and Phidias were among the first generation of Greek sculptors to attract schools of followers. Polykleitos's school lasted for at least three generations, but it seems to have been most active in the late 4th century and early 3rd century BCE. The Roman writers Pliny and Pausanias noted the names of about twenty sculptors in Polykleitos's school, defined by their adherence to his principles of balance and definition. Skopas and Lysippus are among the best-known successors of Polykleitos, along with other, more obscure statuaries, such as Athenodoros of Cleitor and Asopodorus.

Polykleitos's son, Polykleitos the Younger, worked in the 4th century BCE. Although the son was also a sculptor of athletes, his greatest fame was won as an architect. He designed the great theatre at Epidaurus.

== Gallery ==
Roman copies or interpretations of lost original works attributed to Polykleitos
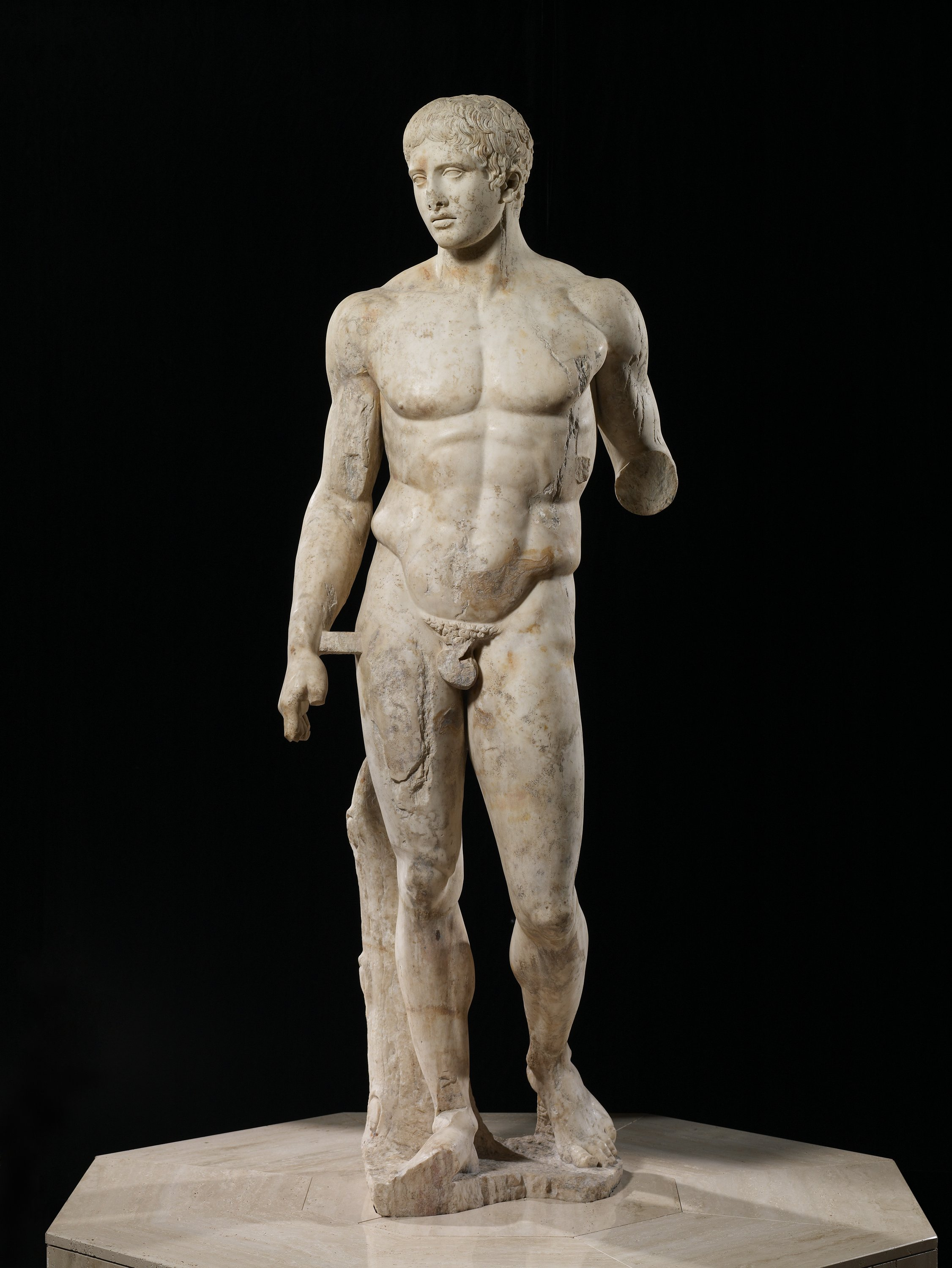
Doryphoros, Minneapolis Institute of Art

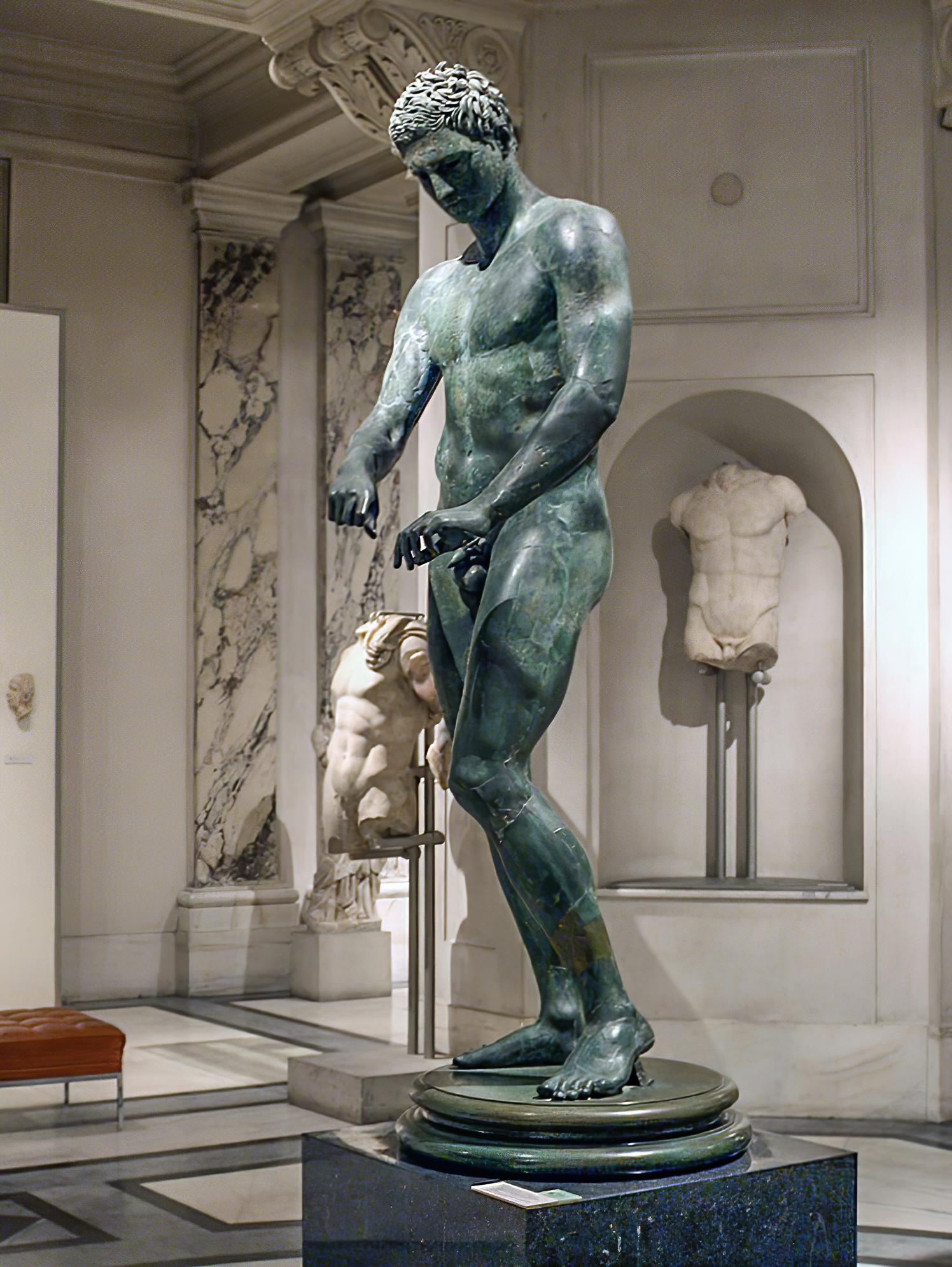
Bronze statue of an athlete from Ephesus cleaning his strigil; 1st century CE copy of a possible original by Polykleitos

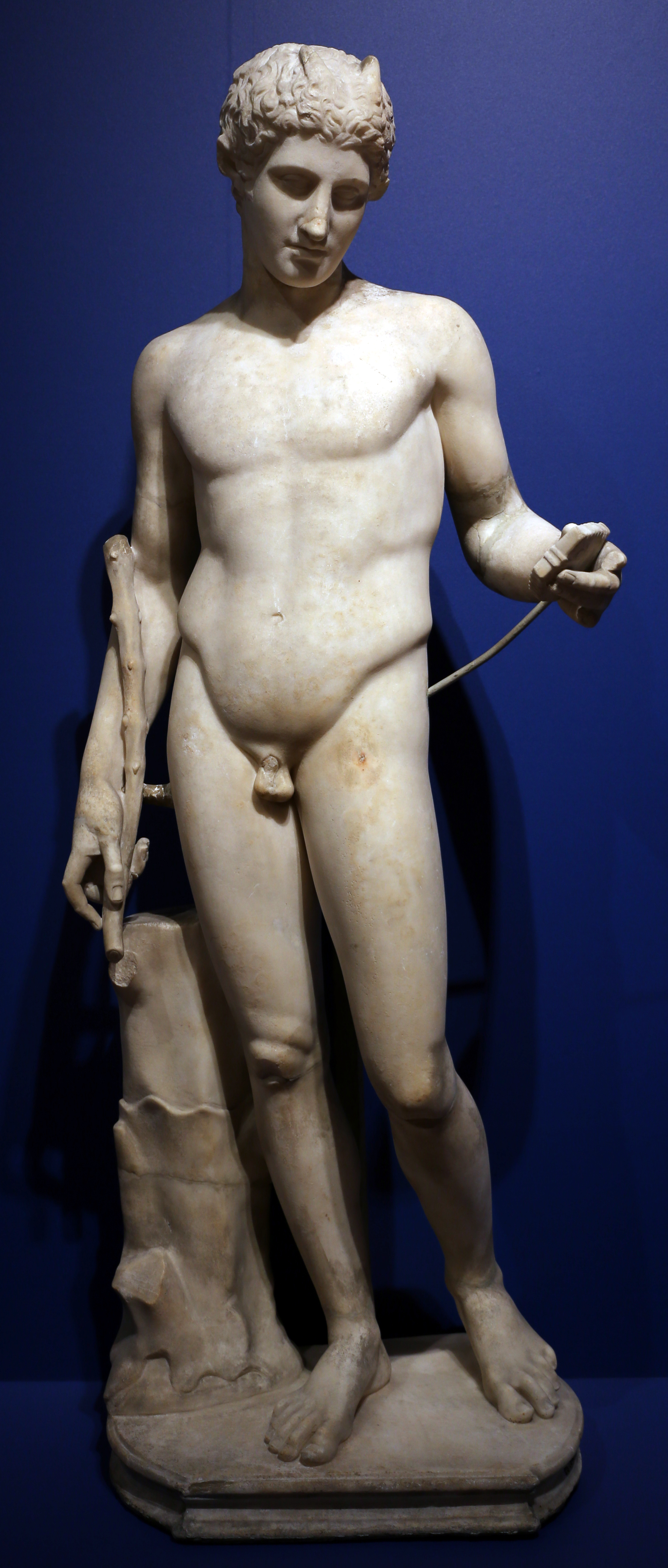
Pan with flute, Roman copy of a possible original by Polykleitos

== Sources ==
- Pausanias (1911) [143-176]. Description of Greece. Translated by W H S Jones. London: Heinman.
- This article incorporates text from a publication now in the public domain: Chisholm, Hugh, ed. (1911). "Polyclitus". Encyclopædia Britannica. Vol. 22 (11th ed.). Cambridge University Press. pp. 22–23.
- Tobin, Richard (1975). "The Canon of Polykleitos". American Journal of Archaeology. 79 (4): 307–321. doi:10.2307/503064. JSTOR 503064. S2CID 191362470.
