= Doryphoros =

Sculpture by Polykleitos of a warrior

External videos
- Polykleitos, Doryphoros, Smarthistory

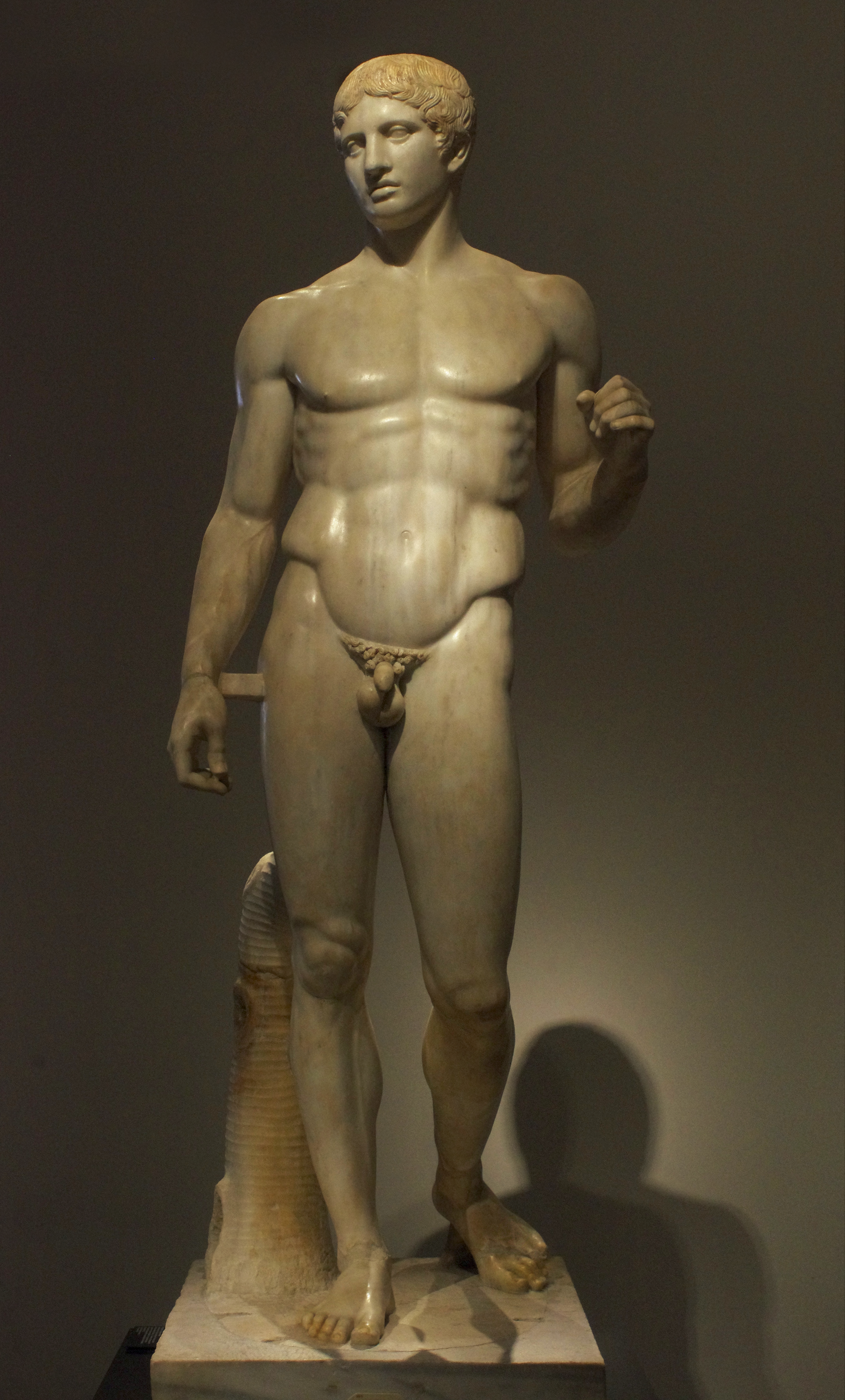
A well-preserved Roman period copy of the Doryphoros of Polykleitos from the collection of Naples National Archaeological Museum. Material: marble. Height: 2.12 metres (6 feet 11 inches).

The Doryphoros (Greek Δορυφόρος Classical Greek Greek pronunciation: [dorypʰóros], "Spear-Bearer"; Latinised as Doryphorus) of Polykleitos is one of the best known Greek sculptures of Classical antiquity, depicting a solidly built, muscular, standing warrior, originally bearing a spear balanced on his left shoulder. The lost bronze original of the work would have been cast circa 440 BC, but it is today known only from later (mainly Roman period) marble copies. The work nonetheless forms an important early example of both Classical Greek contrapposto and classical realism; as such, the iconic Doryphoros proved highly influential elsewhere in ancient art.

== Conception ==
The renowned Greek sculptor Polykleitos designed a sculptural work as a demonstration of his written treatise, entitled the Κανών (or 'Canon'), translated as "measure" or "rule", exemplifying what he considered to be the perfectly harmonious and balanced proportions of the human body in the sculpted form.

At some point in the 2nd century AD, the Greek medical writer Galen wrote about the Doryphoros as the perfect visual expression of the Greeks' search for harmony and beauty, which is rendered in the perfectly proportioned sculpted male nude:

Chrysippos holds beauty to consist not in the commensurability or "symmetria" [i.e., proportions] of the constituent elements [of the body], but in the commensurability of the parts, such as that of finger to finger, and of all the fingers to the palm and wrist, and of those to the forearm, and of the forearm to the upper arm, and in fact, of everything to everything else, just as it is written in the Canon of Polyclitus. For having taught us in that work all the proportions of the body, Polyclitus supported his treatise with a work: he made a statue according to the tenets of his treatise, and called the statue, like the work, the 'Canon'.

Polykleitos is known as the best sculptor of men, with the primary subjects of his works being male athletes with idealized body proportions. He was interested in the mathematical proportions of the human form, which led him to write an essay (the "Kanon") on the proportions of humans. The Doryphoros is an illustration of his writings in Kanon on the symmetry between the body parts. Polykleitos achieved a balance between muscular tensions and relaxation due to the chiastic principle that he relied on. "Scholars agree that Polykleitos based his calculations on a single module, perhaps the terminal section of the little finger, to determine the corresponding measurements of each body part".

== Description ==
The original was made out of bronze in about 440 BC but is now lost (along with most other bronze sculptures made by a known Greek artist). Neither the original statue nor the treatise have yet been found; it is widely considered that they have not survived from antiquity. Fortunately, several Roman copies in marble (of varying quality and completeness) do survive to convey the essential form of Polykleitos' work.

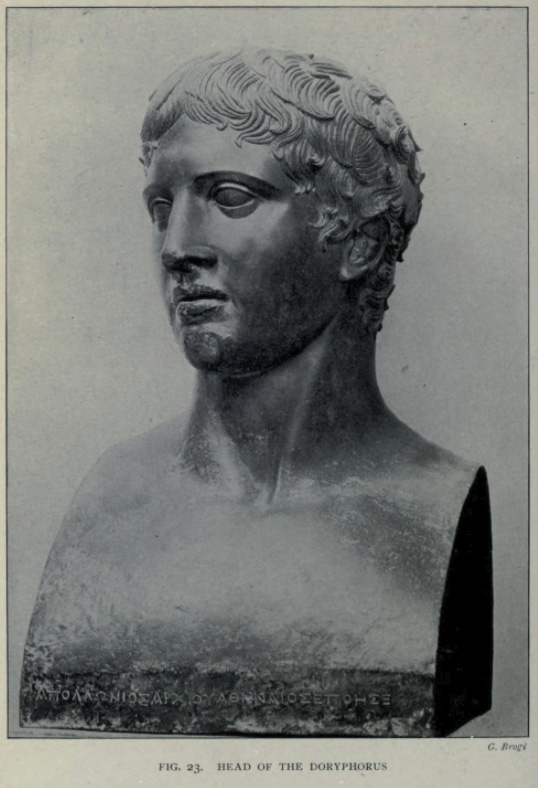
Head of Doryphoros excavated at the Villa of the Papyri in Pompeii

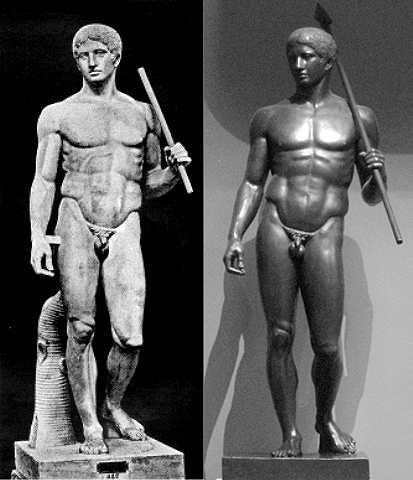
Composite picture showing the difference between marble and bronze versions of the Doryphoros

Polykleitos used distinct proportions when creating this work; for example, the ratio of head to body size is one to seven. The figure's head turned slightly to the right, the heavily-muscled but athletic figure of the Doryphoros is depicted standing in the instant that he steps forward from a static pose. This posture reflects only the slightest incipient movement, and yet the limbs and torso are shown as fully responsive.

The left hand originally held a long spear; the left shoulder (on which the spear originally rested) is depicted as tensed and therefore slightly raised, with the left arm bent and tensed to maintain the spear's position. The figure's pose is classical contrapposto, most obviously seen in the angled positioning of the pelvis. The figure's right leg is straightened, depicted as supporting the body's weight, with the right hip raised and the right torso contracted. The left leg bears no weight and the left hip drops, slightly extending the torso on the left side. The right arm hangs positioned by the figure's side, bearing no load. It is perhaps the earliest extant example of a free-hanging arm in a statue.

In the surviving Roman marble copies, a large sculpted tree stump is added behind one leg of the statue in order to support the weight of the stone; this would not have been present in the original bronze (the tensile strength of the metal would have made this unnecessary). A small strut is also usually present to support the right hand and lower arm.

== Extant Roman copies ==
The sculpture was known through the Roman marble replica found in Herculaneum and conserved in the Naples National Archaeological Museum but, according to Francis Haskell and Nicholas Penny, early connoisseurs such as Johann Joachim Winckelmann passed it by in the royal Bourbon collection at Naples without notable comment. The marble sculpture and a bronze head that had been retrieved at Herculaneum were published in Le Antichità di Ercolano, (1767) but were not identified as representing Polykleitos' Doryphorus until 1863.

For modern eyes, a fragmentary Doryphoros torso in basalt in the Medici collection at the Uffizi "conveys the effect of bronze, and is executed with unusual care", as Kenneth Clark noted, illustrating it in The Nude: A Study in Ideal Form: "It preserves some of the urgency and concentration of the original" lost in the full-size "blockish" marble copies.

Perhaps the best known copy of the Doryphoros was excavated in Pompeii and now resides in the Museo Archeologico Nazionale di Napoli [Naples, Museo Nazionale 6011]. Held in the same museum is a bronze herma of Apollonios [height 0.54 m, Naples, Museo Nazionale 4885], considered by many scholars to be an almost flawless replica of the original Doryphoros head.

A well-preserved, Roman period copy of the statue in Pentelic marble, purchased in 1986 by the Minneapolis Institute of Art (MIA), has received some attention in recent years. This copy is 1.98 m high and dates to the first century BC or first century AD. It is the best-preserved surviving copy of the Doryphoros, though missing its left arm, a finger from its right hand, and its right foot. The sculpture was supposedly found in Italian waters during the 1930s and spent several decades in private collections before being loaned to the Munich Glyptothek in the late 1970s, and bought by the MIA in 1986. The Italian government asserts that the statue was illegally excavated between 1975 and 1976 from the Verano hill at Castellammare di Stabia, near Naples, and has issued an international warrant for confiscation and return of the work.

Another copy was found in 2012, in the Roman thermae of Baelo Claudia (outside of Tarifa, near the village of Bolonia, in southern Spain).

== Influence ==
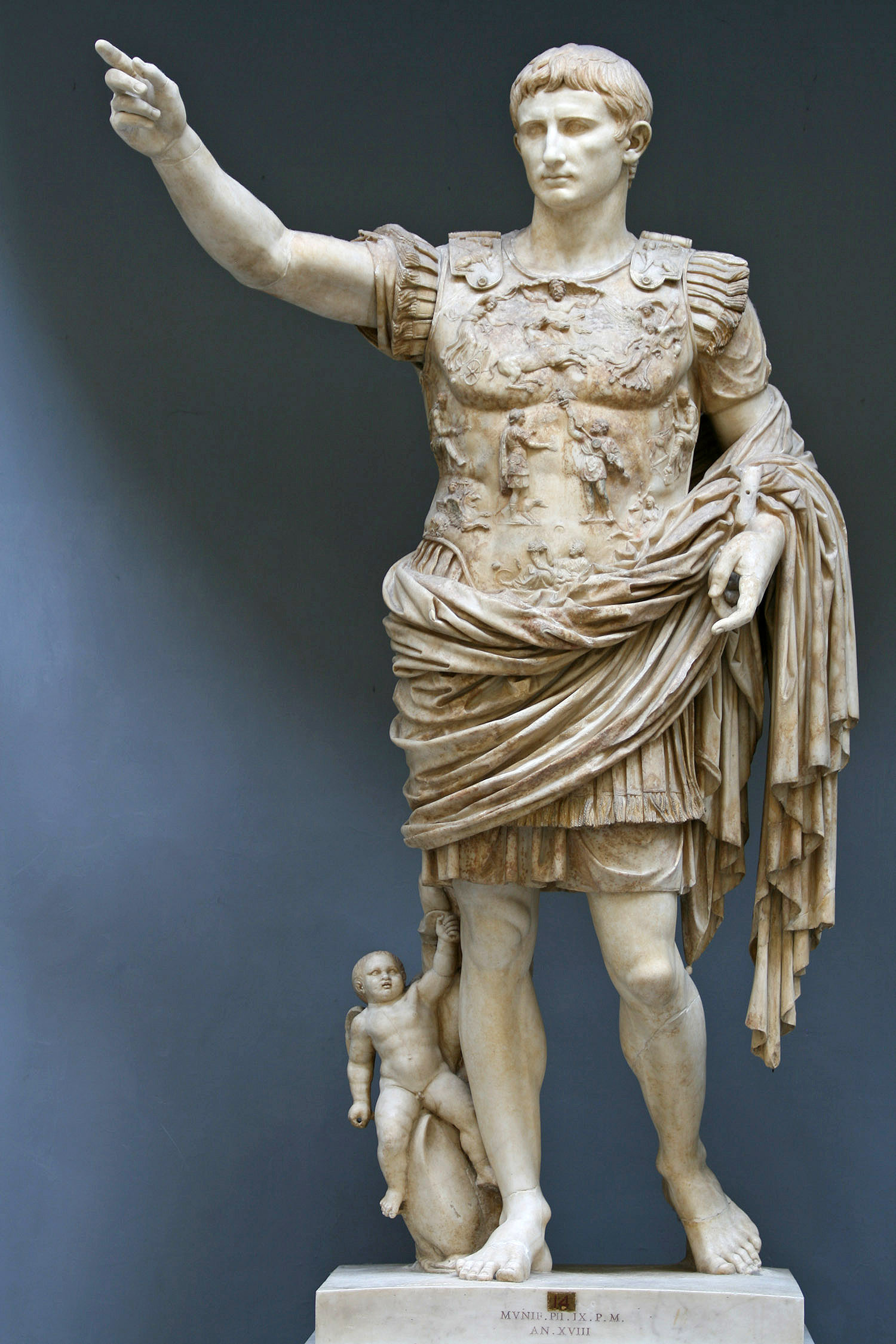
Statue of Augustus of Prima Porta

The Doryphoros was created during the high Classical period. During this time, there was an emphasis put on the ideal man who was shown in heroic nudity. The body would be that of a young athlete that included chiseled muscles and a naturalistic pose. The face is generic, displaying no emotion. Some scholars believe that Doryphoros represented a young Achilles on his way to battle in the Trojan War, while others believe that there is confusion whether the sculpture is meant to depict a mortal or a hero. There have also been discussions on where these sculptures would be located during high Classical period, depending on where they were discovered. For example, the copy in Naples was found in the municipal Gymnasium of Pompeii, which leads us to believe that one may have been placed near fitness programs of the youth. Copies were also common for patrons to place in or outside their home.

The canonic proportions of the male torso established by Polykleitos ossified in Hellenistic and Roman times in the muscle cuirass, exemplified by the Augustus of Prima Porta, who wears ceremonial dress armour modelled in relief over an idealised muscular torso which is ostensibly modelled on the Doryphoros. The same depiction has the legs of the emperor arranged in the same manner as the stance of the Doryphoros.

Another example of the influence the Doryphoros had on sculpture much later than its initial conception can be seen in Michelangelo's David, now located in the Galleria dell'Accademia, Florence. The contrapposto style, idealised youthful male nudity, and overall antiquitical inspiration all show echoes of Polykleitos' Doryphoros. There is a chance however that the David was not so much designed with the Doryphoros in mind specifically, but the wider style contrappostic proportioning of which Polykleitos spread as a result of his work, as seen in the aforementioned Prima Porta statue, or with the statue of the Apollo Belvedere.

== Modern images ==
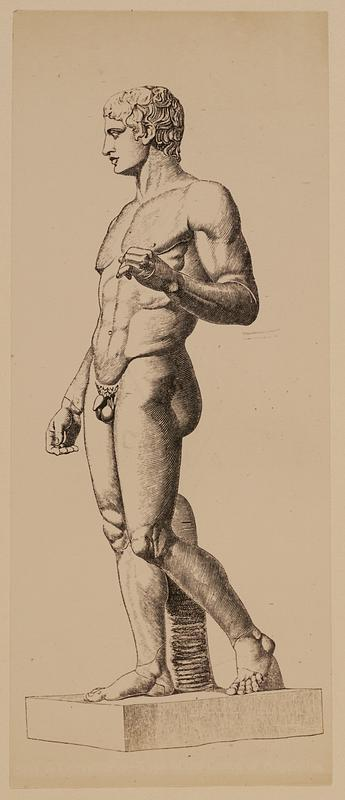
A Doryphorus-type of the canon Polycleitus, ca. 1886–1889. Nicholas Catsimpoolas Collection, Boston Public Library

Contrapposto scheme

Canon Polycleitus scheme

3D model of replica at the National Gallery of Denmark

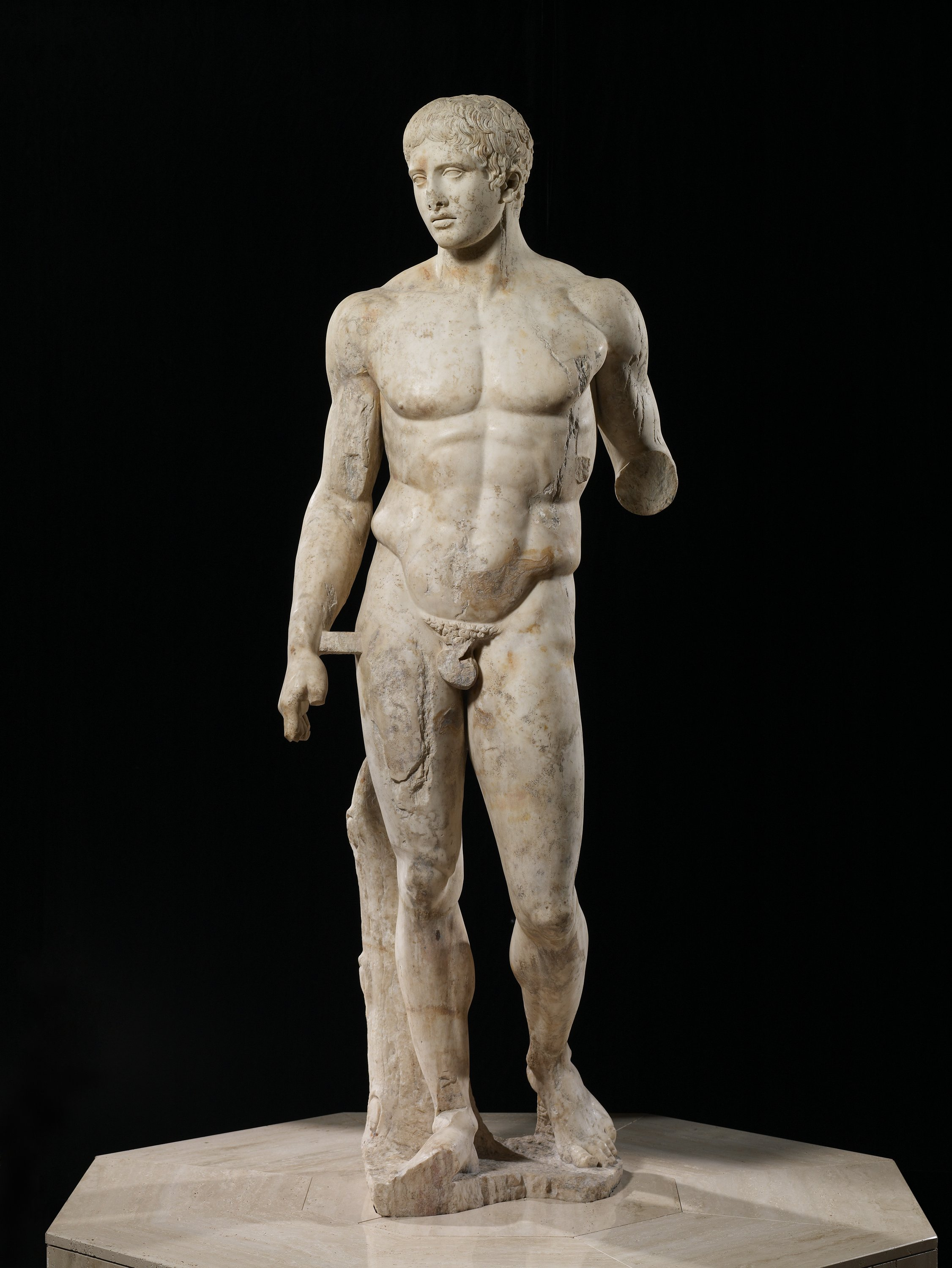
Doryphoros (the Spear Bearer), in the collection of the Minneapolis Institute of Art

== See also ==
- Diadumenos – Sculpture by Polykleitos (youth tying headband)
- Discophoros – Sculpture by Polyclitus (athlete with discus)
