= Hermes of Aegium =

Statue of Hermes in the NAMA

- Greek: Ἑρμῆς τοῦ Αἰγίου
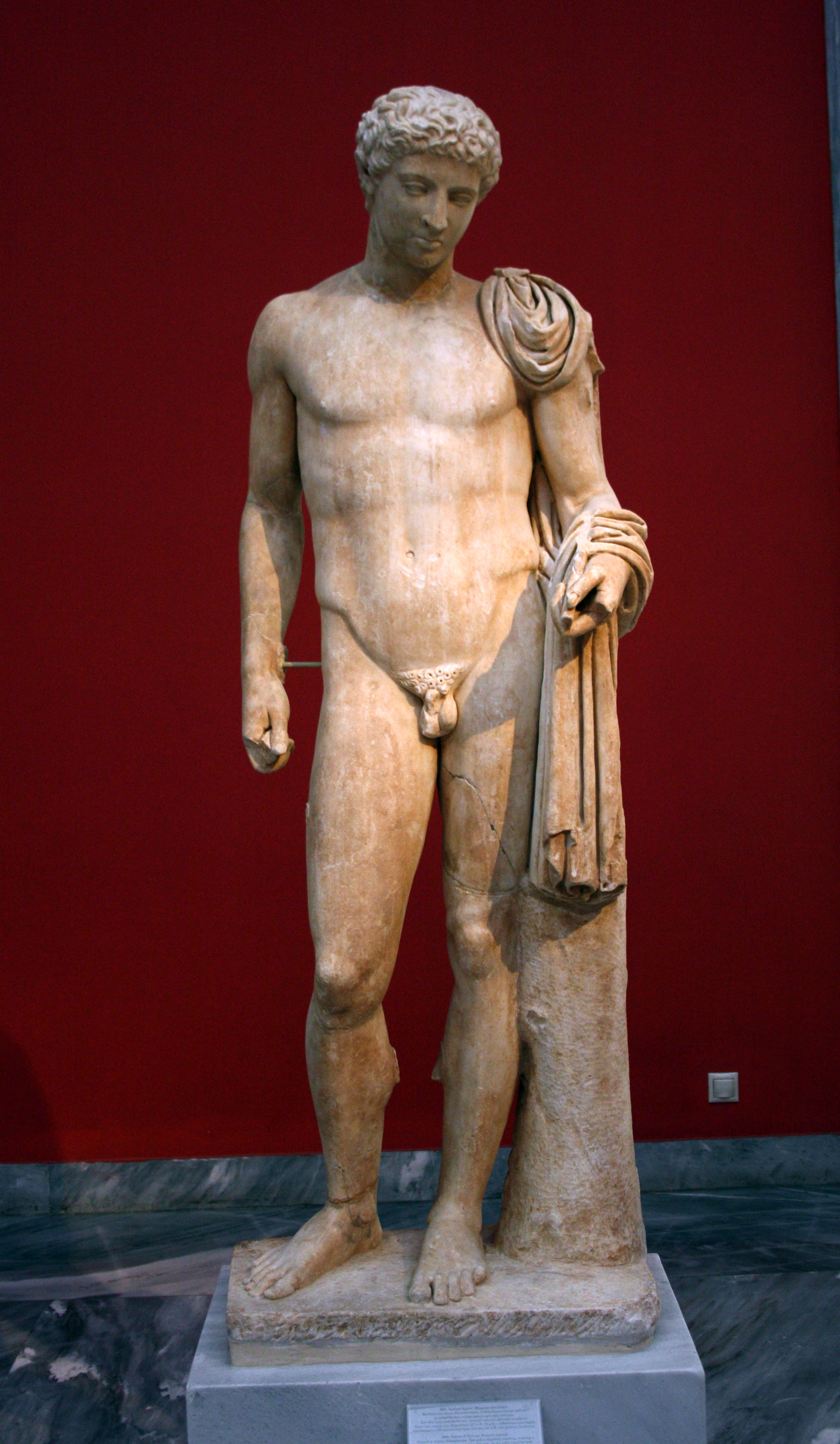
- The statue in the NAMA in 2009
- Year: 1st century BC or AD
- Catalogue: No 241
- Medium: Marble
- Movement: Classical-inspired
- Subject: The god Hermes
- Dimensions: 171 cm (67 in)
- Condition: Intact
- Location: National Archaeological Museum, Athens
- Owner: Greece
- Website: https://www.namuseum.gr/

Hermes of Aegium (Greek: Ερμής του Αιγίου) is a lifesize Roman sculpture of the Greek messenger god Hermes found in the town of Aegium in southern Greece in mid nineteenth century. It is now housed in the National Archaeological Museum in the capital Athens under accession number 241. It is nearly intact with minor damage.

== History ==
Hermes of Aegium was produced during the Roman period, around the Augustan Age (late first century BC and early first century AD, when Augustus was emperor), and was most likely used as a funerary sculpture. It was found in Aigion (ancient Aegium) in Achaea (Peloponnese, in southern Greece) after which it took its name, in 1860. It was purchased by the archaeological society for 12,000 drachmas.

== Description ==
This life-size statue stands at 171 cm in height, and it is made of pentelic white marble. Although created during Roman times, certain Lysippean features and influence can be clearly identified on it.

Hermes stands up, resting his weight on his left leg (a typical sculptural posture known as contrapposto) while his relaxed right leg is bent at the knee and drawn slightly to his side and behind. A chlamys hangs from his left shoulder, wound around his left arm and hanging on the marble support, which here takes the shape of a tree trunk.

In his right hand Hermes holds a purse, of which the upper part does not survive, and on his left he would have held a caduceus, his most recognisable symbol, which is not preserved at all. His head, carved in idealized shape, has strong features and is inclined to the left; his short, tousled hair is carved in the shape of crescent locks framing his face quite low on the forehead.

The statues bears some resemblance to another Roman statue of the god found in Greece, the Atalante Hermes, but is rather of poorer quality compared to that one, and especially compared to the Hermes of Andros.

== See also ==
- Hermes Criophorus (Athens)
- Atalante Hermes
- Hermes of Messene
- Bust of Hadrian (Piraeus)
- Hermes of Andros

== Bibliography ==
- Kaltsas, Nikolaos (2002). Sculpture in the National Archaeological Museum, Athens. Los Angeles, US: The J. Paul Getty Museum. ISBN 0-89236-686-9.
- Kaltsas, Nikolaos (2007). Εθνικό Αρχαιολογικό Μουσείο [National Archaeological Museum] (PDF) (in Greek). Athens, Greece: OLKOS. ISBN 978-960-89339-1-0.
- Kavvadias, Panagiotis (1890). Γλυπτά του Εθνικού Μουσείου [Sculptures of the National Museum] (in Greek). Athens, Greece: S. K. Vlastos.
