= Hermes and the Infant Dionysus =

Ancient Greek sculpture

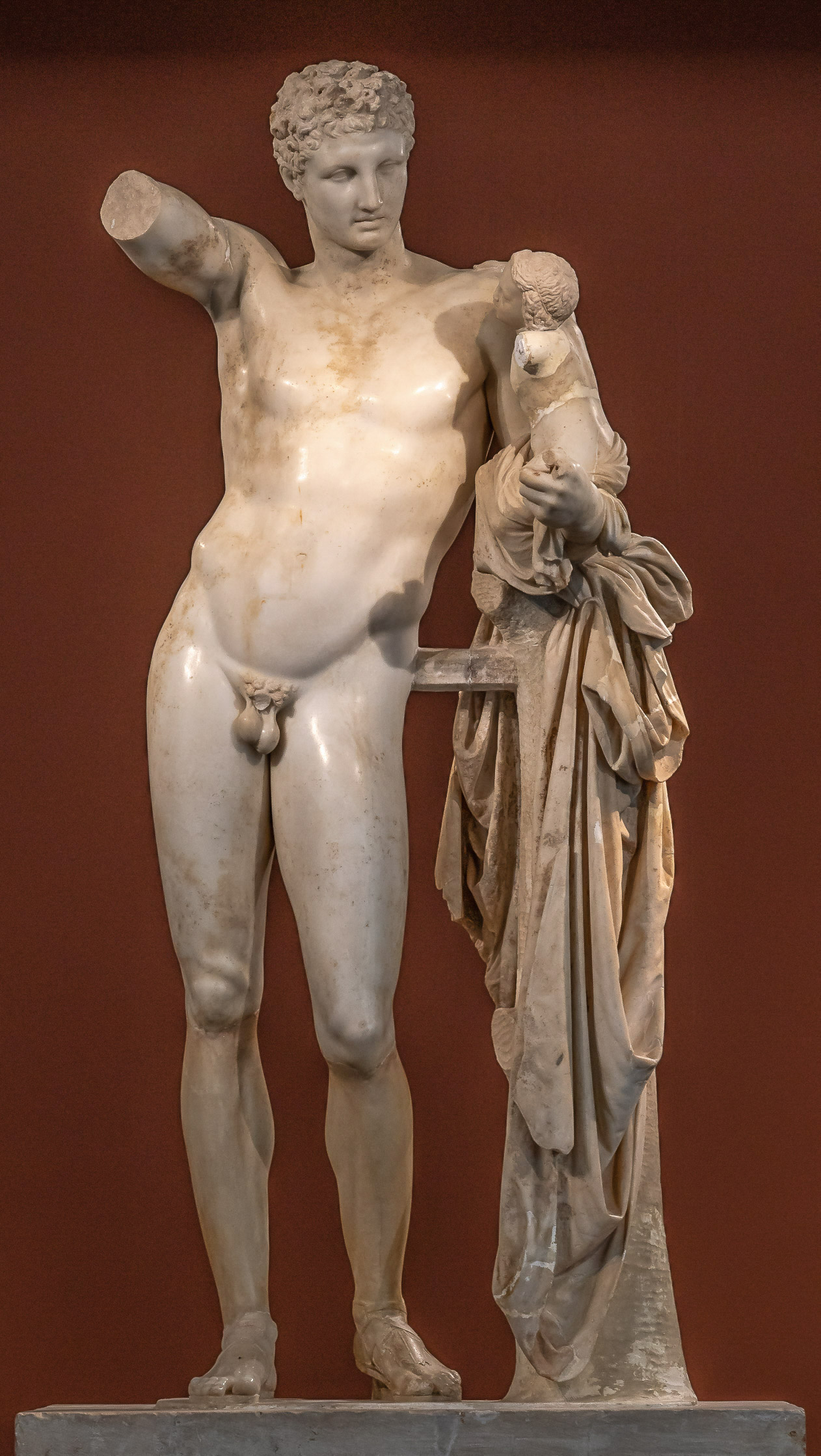
Hermes and the Infant Dionysos, Archaeological Museum of Olympia

Hermes and the Infant Dionysus, also known as the Hermes of Praxiteles or the Hermes of Olympia, is an ancient Greek sculpture of Hermes and the infant Dionysus discovered in 1877 in the ruins of the Temple of Hera, Olympia, in Greece. It is displayed at the Archaeological Museum of Olympia.

It is traditionally attributed to Praxiteles and dated to the 4th century BC, based on a remark by the 2nd century Greek traveller Pausanias, and has made a major contribution to the definition of Praxitelean style. Its attribution is, however, the object of fierce controversy among art historians.

The sculpture is unlikely to have been one of Praxiteles' famous works, as no ancient replicas of it have been identified. The documentary evidence associating the work with Praxiteles is based on a passing mention by the 2nd century AD traveller Pausanias.

== Loss ==
The Olympia site was hit by an earthquake during the reign of the Roman emperor Diocletian in the final years of the third century C.E, collapsing the roof of the Temple of Hera and burying the statue in rubble.

== Rediscovery ==
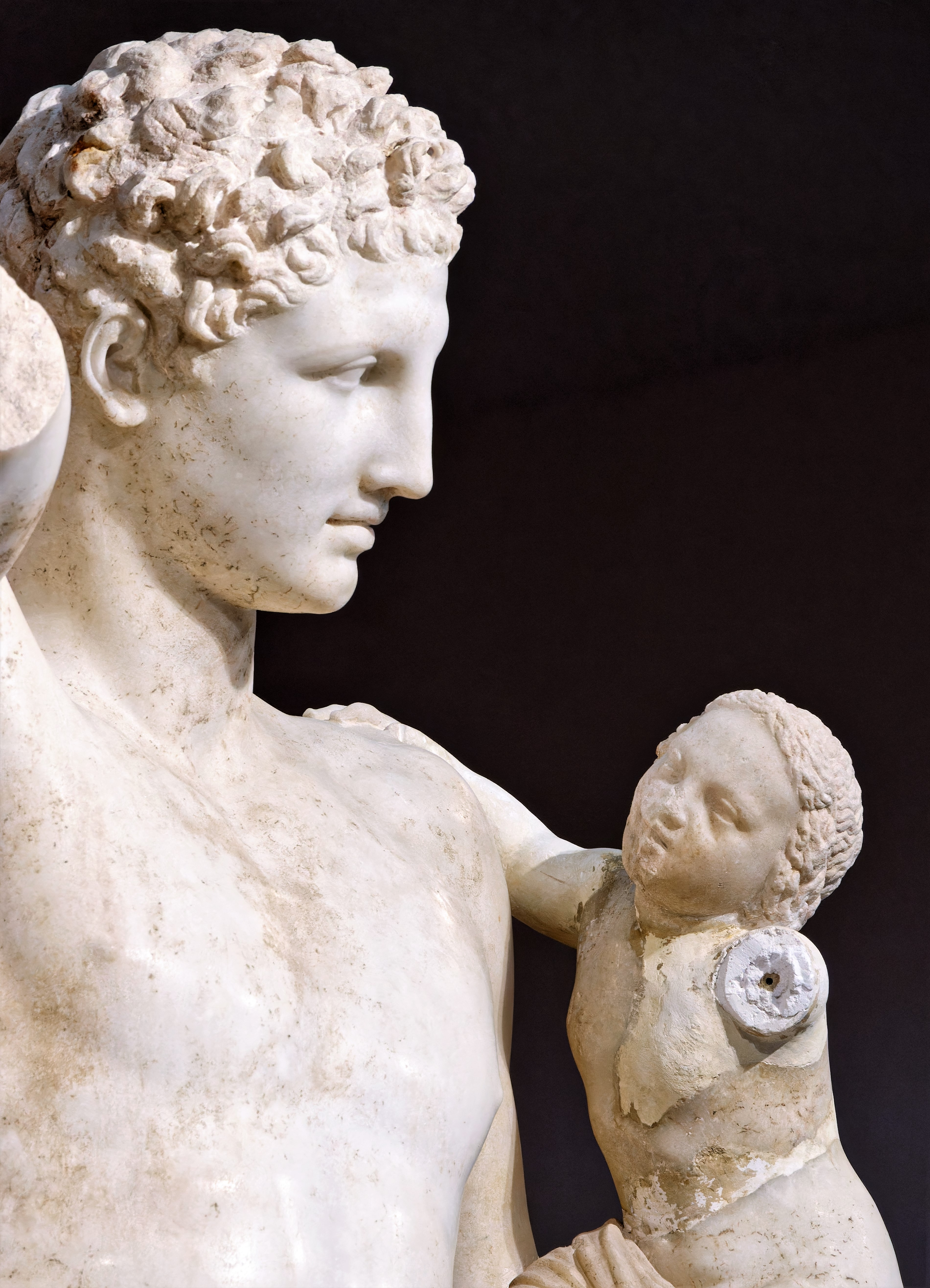
Detail of the faces

In 1874, the Greek state signed an agreement with Germany for an archaeological exploration of the Olympia site, which was first dug in the French Morea expedition of 1829. The German excavations in 1875 were led by Ernst Curtius. On 8 May 1877, in the temple of Hera, he uncovered the body (head, torso, legs, left arm) of a statue of a young man resting against a tree trunk covered by a mantle. Protected by the thick clay layer above it, it was in an exceptionally good state of preservation.

It took six more separate discoveries to uncover the rest of the statue as it is displayed today. Hermes is still missing his right forearm, two fingers of his left hand, both forearms below the elbow, the left foot and his penis, whilst Dionysus is missing his arms (except the right hand on Hermes's shoulder) and the end of his right foot. Much of the tree trunk and the plinth are also lost. However, an ancient base survives, made of a grey limestone block between two blocks of marble.

== Technical considerations ==
The group is sculpted from a block of the best quality of Parian marble. Hermes measures 2.10/2.12 m, 3.70 m with the base. The right foot of Hermes is integral with a section of the base, which has undergone some adjustment in antiquity.

The face and torso of Hermes are striking for their highly polished, glowing surface, which John Boardman half-jokingly attributed to generations of temple workers. The back, by contrast, shows the marks of the rasp and chisel, and the rest of the sculpture is incompletely finished.

At the time of its discovery, the hair retained slight traces of cinnabar, a form of mercury sulfate with a red color, perhaps a preparation for gilding. Cinnabar tints are retained on the sandal straps of the original foot, with traces of gilding. The sandal also bears the motif of a Heraclean knot, which was probably extended in paint.

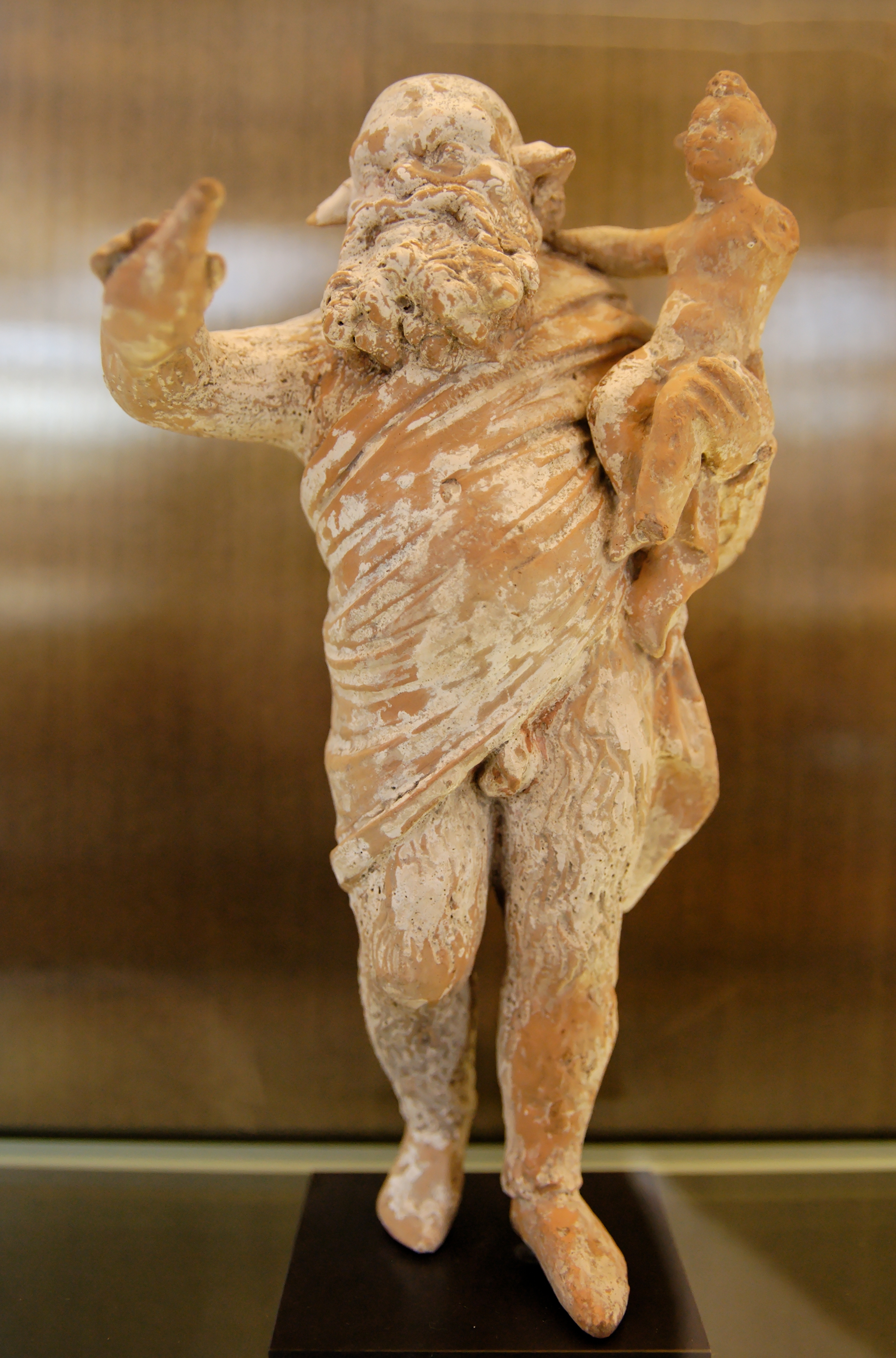
Papposilenus bearing the infant Dionysos, variant on the Olympia Hermes, c. 350–300 BC, Musée du Louvre, Paris

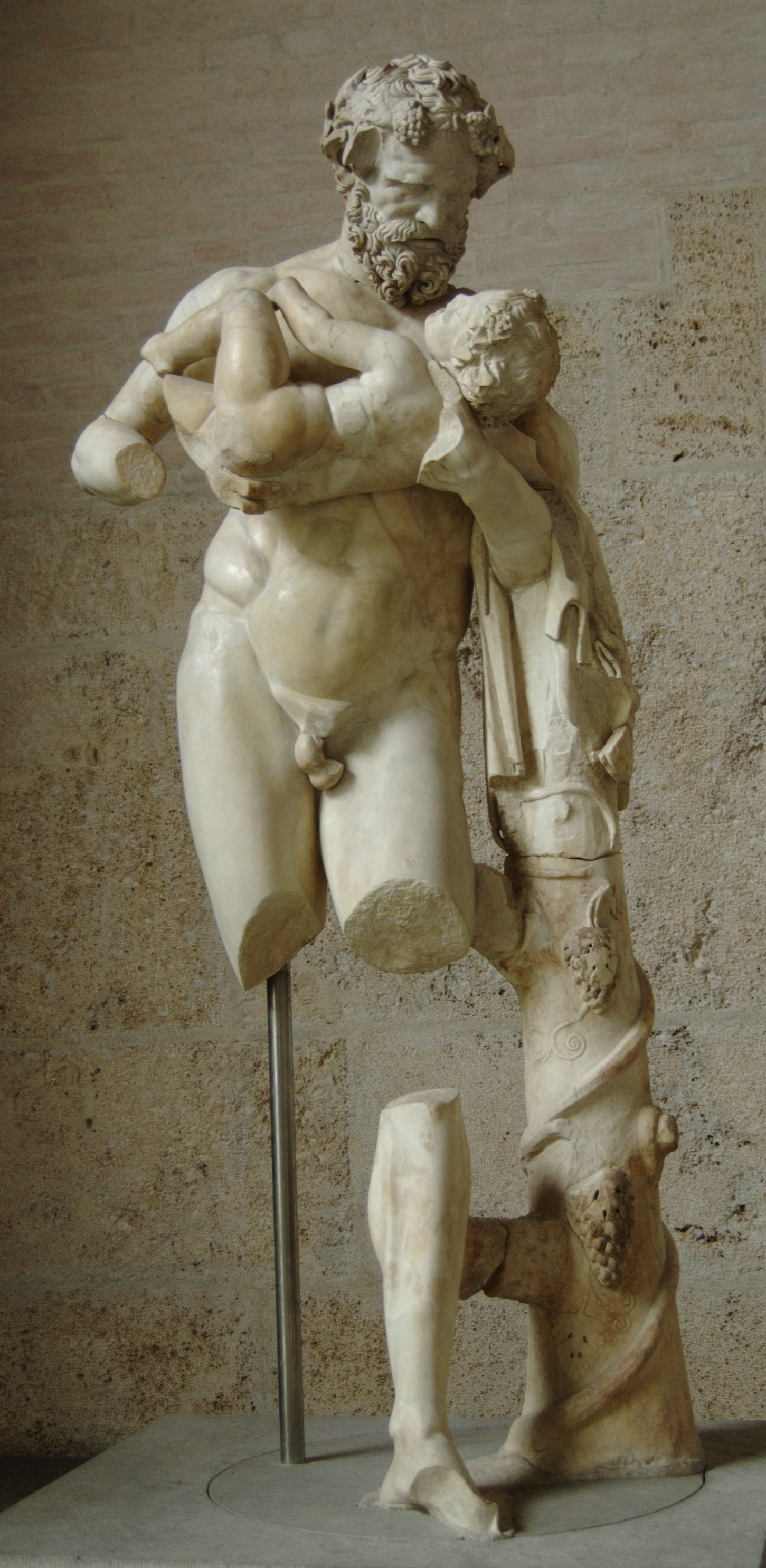
Silenus and the Infant Dionysos, variant from the Palazzo Ruspoli, Rome Glyptothek, Munich

== Popular culture ==
- The statue is present in a scene of The Longest Journey by E.M. Forster.

== See also ==
- Atalante Hermes
- Hermes Criophorus (Athens)
- Hermes of Aegium
- Hermes of Andros
- Hermes of Messene

== General and cited references ==
- Aileen Ajootian, "Praxiteles", Personal Styles in Greek Sculpture (Olga Palagia & Jerome J. Pollitt, eds.), Cambridge University Press, 1998 (1st edition 1996) ISBN 0-521-65738-5, pp. 103-110.
- Rhys Carpenter, "Two Postscripts to the Hermes Controversy", American Journal of Archaeology (January 1954) vol. 58, issue 1, p. 1-12.
- (in French) Alain Pasquier:
  - " L’Hermès d'Olympie », dans Olympie, actes d'un cycle de conférences organisé au musée du Louvre du 18 janvier au 15 mars 1999, Documentation française, Paris, 2001, ISBN 2-11-004780-1, p. 243-271.
  - " Praxitèle aujourd'hui ? La question des originaux », dans Praxitèle, catalogue de l'exposition au musée du Louvre, 23 mars-18 juin 2007, éditions du Louvre & Somogy, 2007, ISBN 978-2-35031-111-1, p. 97-103 et p.&120-122.
- Gisela M. A. Richter, "The Hermes of Praxiteles", American Journal of Archaeology (July–September 1931) vol. 35, issue 3, p. 277-290.
- Brunilde Sismondo Ridgway, Fourth-Century Styles in Greek Sculpture, University of Wisconsin Press, Madison, 1997 (ISBN 0-299-15470-X)
- (in French) Claude Rolley, La Sculpture grecque, vol. II : La période classique, Picard, Manuels d'art et d'archéologie antiques, 1999 (ISBN 2-7084-0506-3), p. 250-254.
- (in German) Georg Treu, Hermes mit dem Dionysosknaben: ein Originalwerk des Praxiteles gefunden im Heraion zu Olympia, Wasmuth, Berlin, 1878.
