= Statue of the priestess Aristonoe =

Marble statue in NAMA

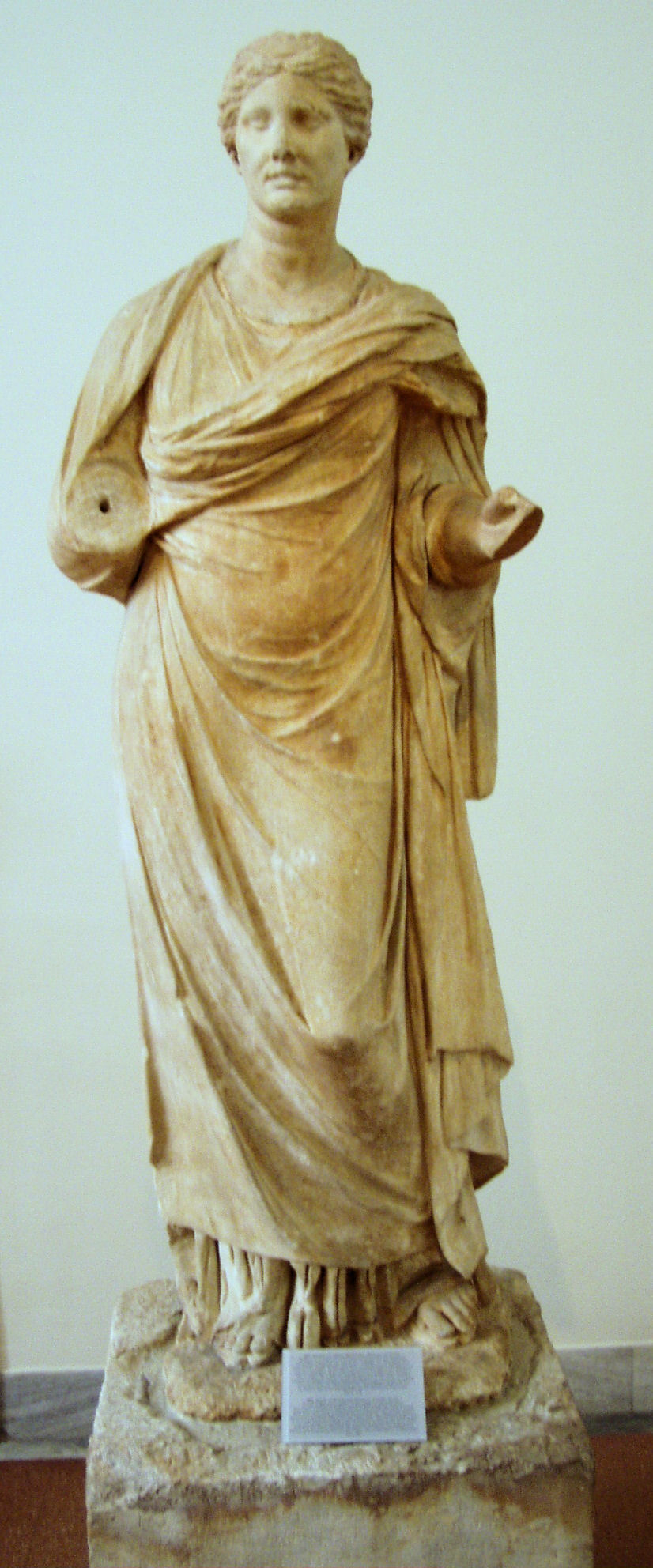
The Statue in the National Archaeological Museum

The Statue of the priestess Aristonoe in the National Archaeological Museum Athens (NAMA), with the inventory number 232, dates from the third century BC.

== Description ==
The statue is made from Pentelic marble and is about life size at 1.62 metres high. It is almost entirely intact, apart from a few dents. Only the lower right arm and the left hand are missing. Both lower arms were carved separately and then attached. The head was also made as a separate piece, but it survives completely intact. The plinth and rectangular base also survive; the base is 38 cm high, 61 cm wide, and 62 cm deep. Aristonoe stands facing the viewer. Her weight rests on her right leg, the left is free. The arms are bent and reach forwards. The head is tilted slightly to the right. The hair is carefully pulled back and over the forehead. Apart from parts of the feet, the lower arms, the neck and the head, the body is fully clothed. Aristonoe wears a chiton and a himation.

The statue was found in 1890 in the temple of Nemesis at Rhamnous which was long attributed to Themis. According to the inscription on the base, the statue was dedicated to the goddess Nemesis. It was donated by Hierokles, son of Hieropoios and Aristonoe. According to the inscription, Aristonoe herself was the daughter of one Nikokrates of Rhamnous.

Inscriptiones Graecae
Greek

Θέμιδι καὶ Νεμέσει
Ἱεροκλῆς Ἱεροποιοῦ Ραμνούοιος
ὰνέθηκε τὴν μητέρα Ἀριοτονόην
Νικοκράτου Ραμνουοίου ἱέρειαν
Νεμέσεως

English

To Themis and Nemesis
Hierokles son of Hieropoios the Rhamnousian
dedicated his mother Aristonoe
daughter of Nikokrates the Rhamnousian, priestess
of Nemesis.

== Bibliography ==
- Nikolaos Kaltsas: Sculpture in the National Archaeological Museum, Athens, The J. Paul Getty Museum, Los Angeles 2002 ISBN 0-89236-686-9, P. 274.
