= Nikolaos Kaltsas =

Nikolaos Kaltsas may refer to:

- Nikolaos Kaltsas (archaeologist)
- Nikos Kaltsas, footballer
