= Grave stele (NAMA 7901) =

Ancient Greek archaic grave marker

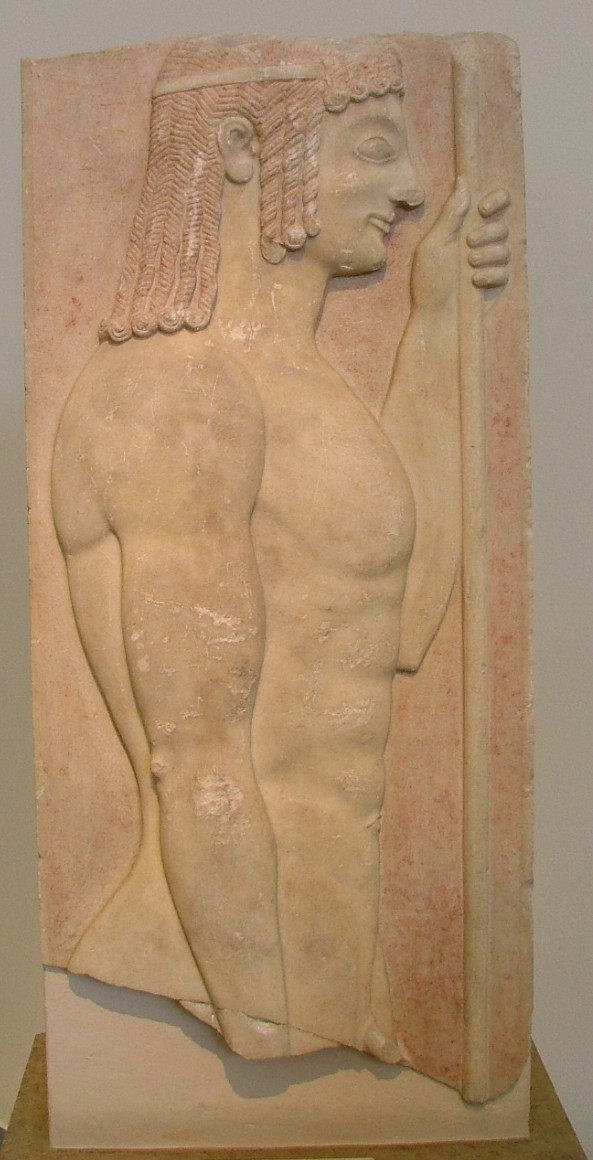
Grave stele in its current display in Athens

The Attic Grave stele in the National Archaeological Museum of Athens (NAMA) with the inventory number 7901 is an archaic grave marker of a young Greek, which was made in the middle of the sixth century BC.

The original height of the grave monument is assumed to have been around 4.5 m. A sphinx probably sat on top. The surviving piece of the stele is 1.16 m high and up to 52 cm wide. The stele, which tapers at the top, is made of Parian marble. A great deal of red-brown paint survives in the background and on the hair. The stele was found in 1973 during excavation of the Themistoclean Wall in Athens and is dated to around the year 550–540.

The stele is only partially preserved. The lower part is missing from the hips, as is the very top. There is further damage to the head, hair and other details, but these do not spoil the impression that it is relatively well preserved. Small pieces broken off the head and right arm have been reconstructed. At its right and left edges, the stele was rimmed by two thin relief bands. The young man is depicted in profile, looking to the right, in the quiet, motionless pose typical of the Archaic period. He is naked and muscular, which creates a strong impression; the spear in the raised left hand marks him as an athlete. His right arm dangles at his side. His shoulder-length hair is gathered in locks, with chin length plaits between his eye and his ear. His hair is tied in place by a narrow band, covered at the front by his hair.

== Bibliography ==
- Nikolaos Kaltsas. Sculpture in the National Archaeological Museum, Athens, The J. Paul Getty Museum, Los Angeles 2002, ISBN 0-89236-686-9, pp. 52–53.
