= Hermes Criophorus (Athens) =

Statue of Hermes in the NAMA

- Greek: Ἑρμῆς Κριοφόρος
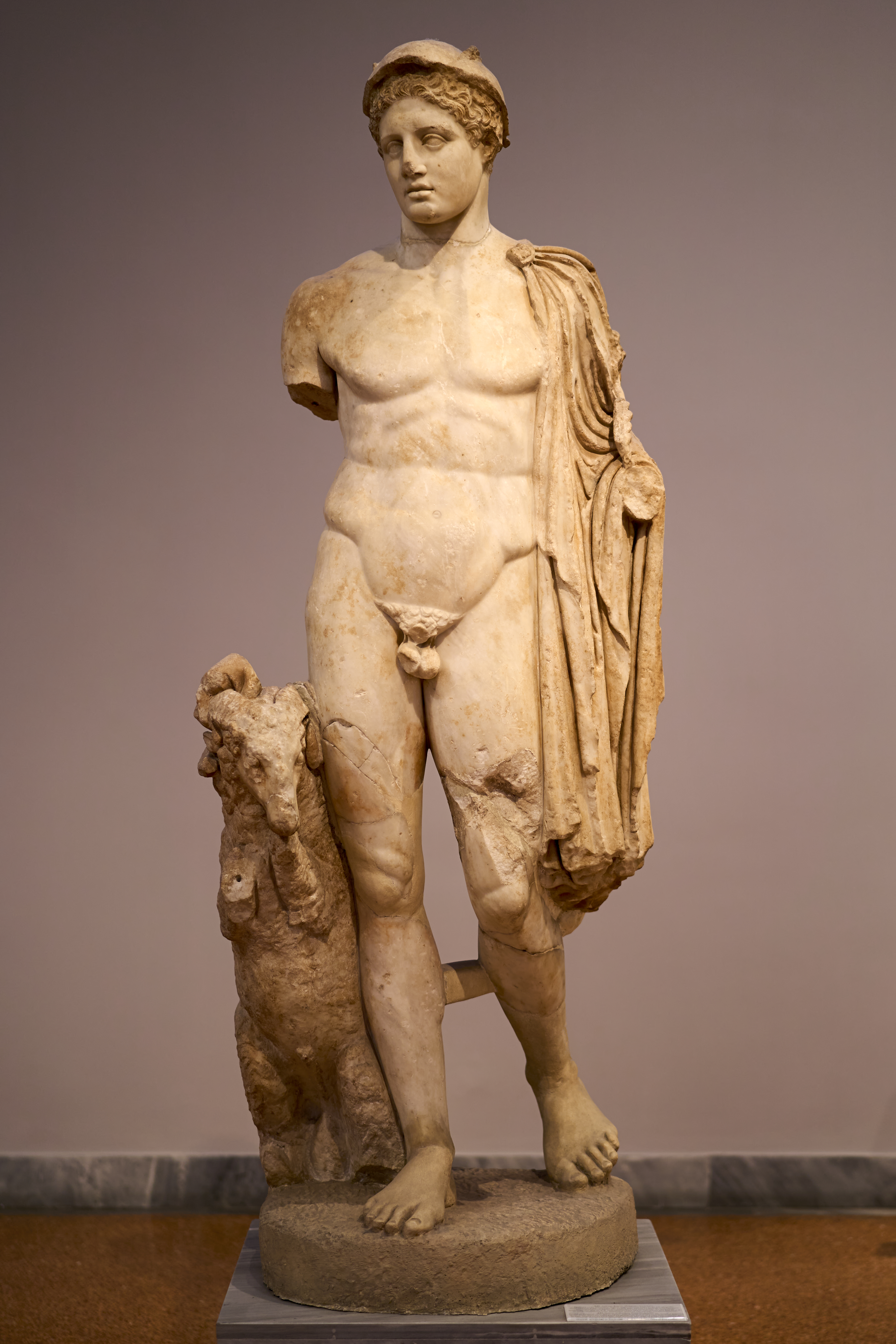
- The statue in the NAMA
- Year: 2nd century AD
- Catalogue: No 243
- Medium: Marble
- Movement: Classical
- Subject: The god Hermes with ram
- Dimensions: 180 cm (71 in)
- Condition: Right arm and left hand missing
- Location: National Archaeological Museum, Athens
- Owner: Greece
- Website: https://www.namuseum.gr/

Hermes Criophorus (Ancient Greek: Ἑρμῆς Κριοφόρος, romanized: Hermês Kriophóros, lit. 'Hermes bearing a ram') is a marble sculpture of the second century AD depicting the Greek god Hermes, as god of pasture and shepherds, carrying away a young ram. The sculpture is a Roman copy of a Greek original of the fifth century BC. It was discovered in Troezenia in southern Greece in late nineteenth century, and it is now part of the collection of the National Archaeological Museum in Athens.

== History ==
Hermes Criophorus was produced sometime during the second century AD, and was a copy of a fifth century original attributed to the sculptor Naukydes of Argos, who was from the school of Polycleitus. It was discovered in the town of Troezen, in the Argolid peninsula (eastern Peloponnese) in 1890, during excavations of the French School carried out under Ernest Legrand. It was given accession number 243 in the National Archaeological Museum of Athens.

== Description ==
It is made of pentelic marble, and it is 1,80 m. tall, thus slightly over lifesize.

Hermes is depicted frontally nude, his body turned a bit to the left, in contrapposto as his weight rests on his right leg, leaving the left leg relaxed. He wears a chlamys fastened on his left shoulder that hangs down and covers the arm on that side. On his head, which is turned to the right, he wears a petasos (a type of hat) and holds a ram by the horns with his right hand. The ram is shown squatting on its hind legs in Hermes's right side, as Hermes drags it upwards. It is thus distinguished from other sculptures of the ram-bearing type, as Hermes drags the animal instead of carrying it tenderly over his shoulders.

On his other hand, Hermes would be carrying his caduceus, his most popular symbol, which is not preserved.

== Condition ==
Although mostly surviving, the statue displays some clear damage. The right arm from below the shoulder, the left hand and the forelegs of the arms are missing; his feet and parts of the thighs were restored with plaster, and the head had to be reattached to its body.

== See also ==
- Atalante Hermes
- Aphrodite of Syracuse
- Hermes of Messene
- Bust of Hadrian (Piraeus)
- Hermes of Andros
- Statuette of Mercury

== Bibliography ==
- Kaltsas, Nikolaos (2002). Sculpture in the National Archaeological Museum, Athens. Los Angeles, US: The J. Paul Getty Museum. ISBN 0-89236-686-9.
- Kaltsas, Nikolaos (2007). Εθνικό Αρχαιολογικό Μουσείο [National Archaeological Museum] (PDF) (in Greek). Athens, Greece: OLKOS. ISBN 978-960-89339-1-0.
- Kavvadias, Panagiotis (1890). Γλυπτά του Εθνικού Μουσείου [Sculptures of the National Museum] (in Greek). Athens, Greece: S. K. Vlastos.
