= Hermes of Andros =

Statue of Hermes in Andros, Greece

- Ερμής της Άνδρου (Greek)
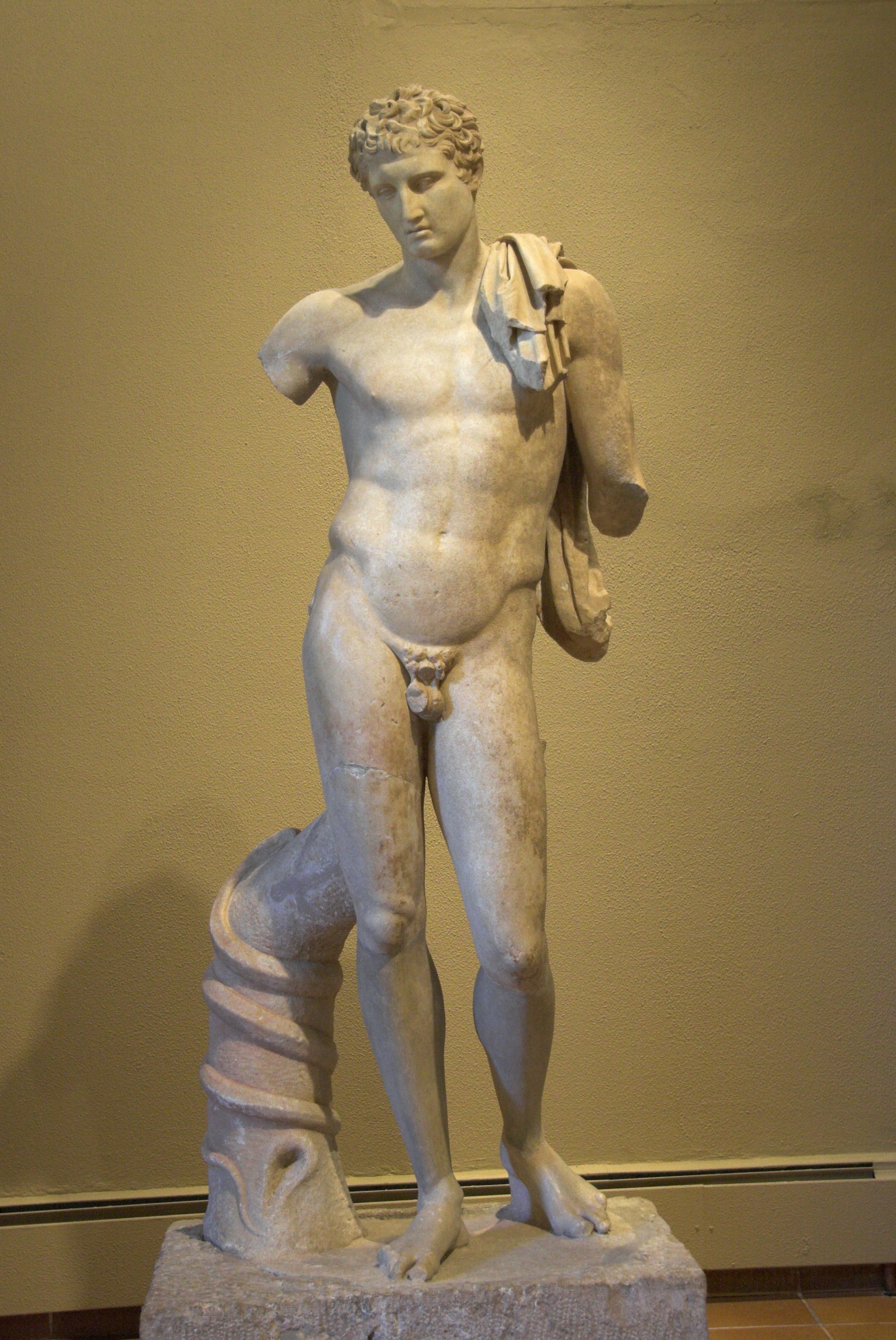
- The statue in the Museum of Andros
- Year: 1st century BC/AD
- Catalogue: No 245 (Note: No 218 back when kept in the NAMA.)
- Medium: Marble
- Movement: Classical
- Subject: Hermes
- Dimensions: 219 cm (86 in)
- Condition: Almost intact
- Location: Archaeological Museum of Andros, Andros
- Owner: Greece

The Hermes of Andros (Greek: Ερμής της Άνδρου) is a large Roman-era marble sculpture of the Greek god Hermes (known to the Romans as Mercury), god of commerce and messengers, that was unearthed in the Aegean island of Andros, Greece in the early eighteenth century.

The sculpture was discovered in the ancient agora of Andros in 1832, just two years following Greece's independence from the Ottoman Empire, and originally displayed in the National Archaeological Museum of Athens for several years until it was finally given back to Andros. Today it is housed in the island, in the Archaeological Museum of Andros.

== History ==
The statue was discovered in 1832 by a man named Demetrios Loukrezis digging in a plot of land he owned on the site of the ancient agora of Andros, alongside a second statue depicting a richly dressed woman (headless). Next year Spyridon Trikoupis announced the discovery of the statues in the archaeological journal Bullettino dell'Instituto di Corrispondenza Archeologica. During his visit in Andros in 1841 King Otto of Greece ordered the statue to be moved to the newly established National Museum (then housed in the Temple of Hephaestus, incorrectly called the Theseum) after paying Loukrezis an amount of money.

Near the site where the statue of Hermes and the woman was found stood a shrine, probably for hero-worship, where a honorific inscription was found that mentioned Egnatia Maximilla and Publius Gleitius Gallus, benefactors of the city during the reign of Emperor Nero (around 65 AD), thus causing the two sculptures to be associated with them. Although the date roughly matched the year the female sculpture was made (which is a Herculaneum Woman-type), Hermes of Andros however proved to be an older work. It was then argued that the statue of Hermes was reused in conjunction with the female statue, which was common to usage of Hermes statues.

Finally in 1981 the statue was returned to Andros, where it has been displayed in the island's archaeological museum ever since.

== Description ==
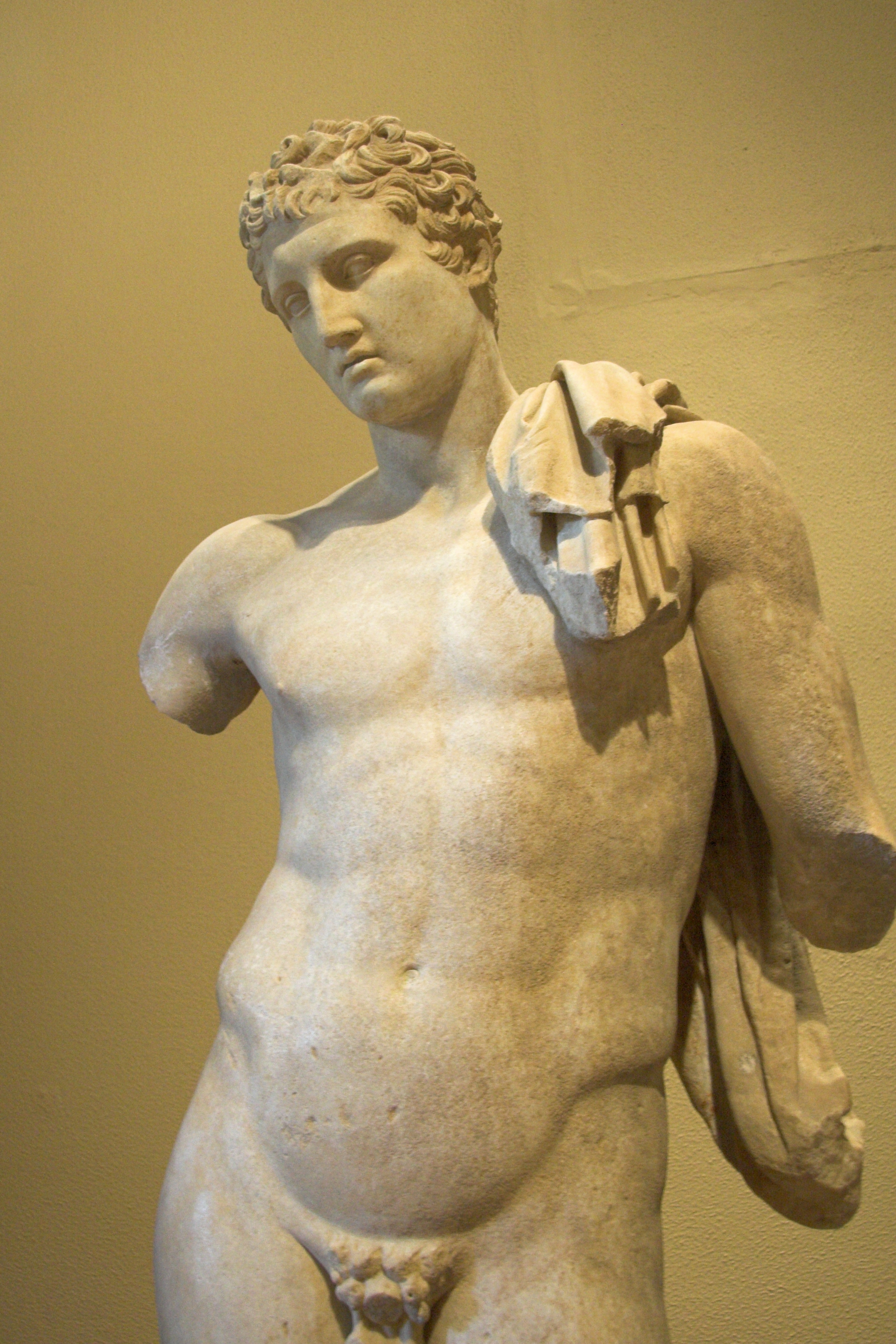
Close-up of torso and head.

At two meters and nineteen centimeters height, this statue made of Parian marble is over lifesize, and considered to be of great artistic value.

The statue, created around the first century BC, or AD, was one of the many copies of the original. That original statue was thought to have been a Lysippean type, but his sculptor belonged to the school of Praxiteles, as comparison with Hermes and the Infant Dionysus shows; it was thus produced around 360 BC.

The statue was found without arms and legs below the knees (which were later restored). The young god is nude, his chlamys resting on his left shoulder and falling down in his back. He supports his weight on his right leg, while the left one is slightly bent. To his right side is a support, shaped in the form of a tree trunk, around which is coiled a large snake. Hermes's head is tilted to the right. This sculpture from Andros is of the "Farnese" statuary type, and is in fact one of its best preserved examples.

Comparison with other extant copies, particularly the one displayed in the British Museum, can give us a clear picture of what the missing parts were like: the rest of his right hand (below the elbow) rested on the god's hip, while the missing chlamys wrapped around the slightly bent left arm and fell freely next to it. Hermes would also be holding a caduceus, the god's famed symbol, and wearing winged sandals (in Hermes of Andros, the feet were restored with no sandals).

The craftmanship and harmony of this statue has been much praised, as one of the finest surviving statues in Greece. It has been described as having all the naturalness, delicacy and grace that is missing from the similar statue Atalante Hermes, which is not Praxitelean but rather has Lysippean characteristics, and is made of Pentelic marble.

== See also ==
- Hermes of Aegium
- Hermes of Messene
- Hermes Criophorus (Athens)
- Hermes and the Infant Dionysus

== Bibliography ==
- Kaltsas, Nikolaos (2002). Sculpture in the National Archaeological Museum, Athens. Los Angeles, US: The J. Paul Getty Museum. ISBN 0-89236-686-9.
- Kavvadias, Panagiotis (1890). Γλυπτά του Εθνικού Μουσείου [Sculptures of the National Museum] (in Greek). Athens, Greece: S. K. Vlastos.
