= Attic funerary relief (NAMA 4464) =

Ancient Greek funerary relief

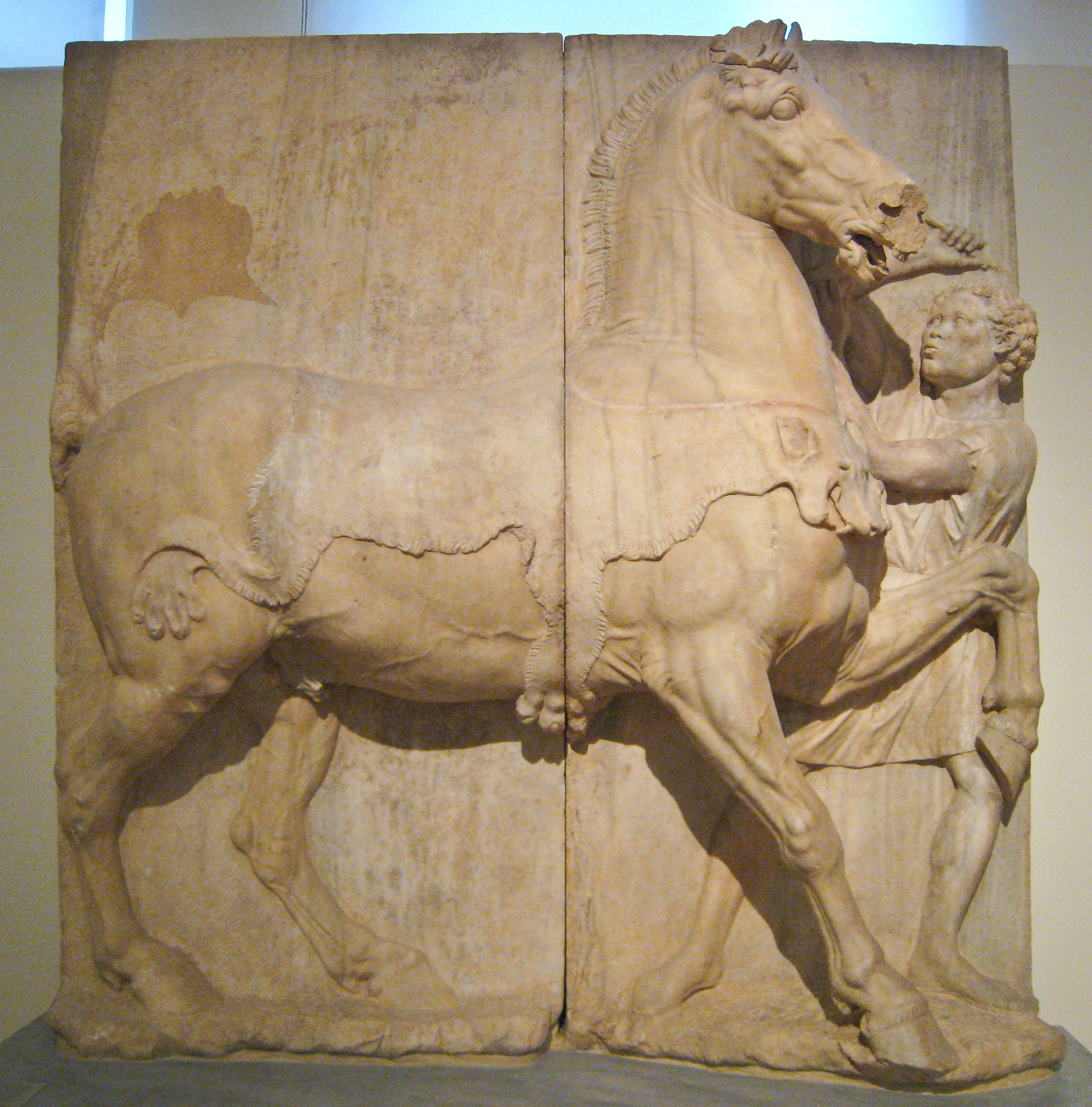
Full side view of the surviving portion of the funerary relief

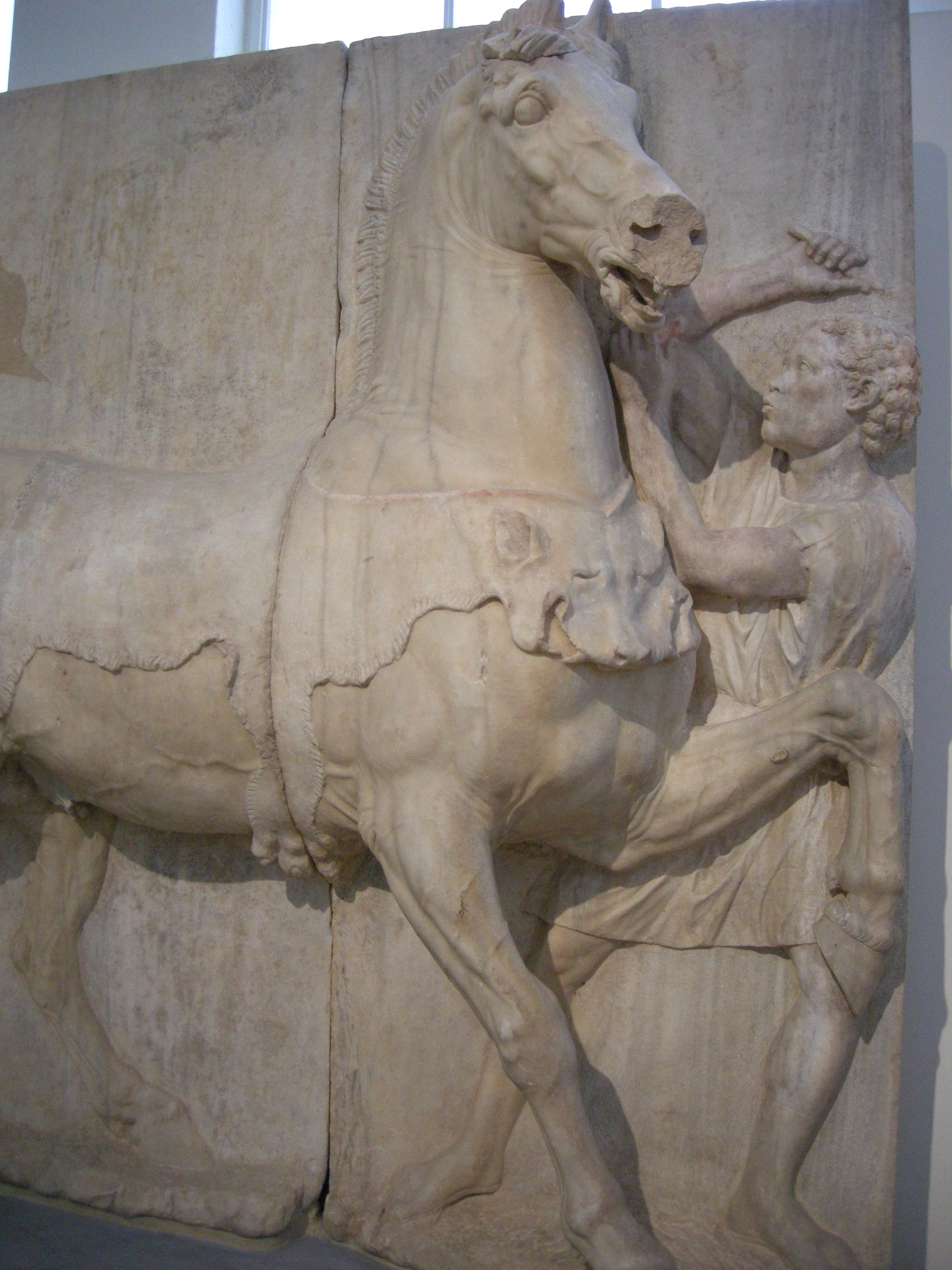
Three quarter detail view

An Attic funerary relief, sometimes also known as the Mithridates funerary relief is displayed at the National Archaeological Museum of Athens (NAMA), with the inventory number 4464. Its date is uncertain.

== Description ==
The Pentelic marble relief consists of two plates and there must have been a third piece on the left hand side, containing at least the tail of the horse. The central figure of the relief is a horse moving to the right, with its head pulled upwards away from the right edge of the relief. A portion of the horses nose is missing, the only substantial damage to the piece. Its left foreleg is raised and bent, the right is stretched out and planted firmly in the ground. The hind legs reinforce the horse's position, the left hind leg is in very low relief, only barely extending out of the surface. On the horse's back is a panther pelt, which is attached around its front. At the front, to its left, stands a stable boy who reaches up to strike the horse with a whip, as the pained posture of the horse's head makes clear. The boy wears a chiton. His hair is cut short, but the pattern of the locks indicates that he is an exotic foreigner. It is probably that he is an African slave, most likely from Ethiopia.

== Dating ==
Arabs and Africans were depicted in Greek art from the fourth century BC. In addition to this example, the 2-metre-high (6.6 ft), 1.9-metre-wide (6.2 ft) relief found in 1948 near the Larisa metro-station must date to near the end of the fourth century BC. Other datings assign the relief to the first century BC. If one takes the earlier dating it is assumed that the relief belonged to a large grave naiskos; supporters of the later dating often connect it with the funerary monument of King Mithridates VI Eupator of Pontus.

== Bibliography ==
- Nikolaos Kaltsas, Sculpture in the National Archaeological Museum, Athens, The J. Paul Getty Museum, Los Angeles 2002 ISBN 0-89236-686-9, p. 206.
