= Atalante Hermes =

Statue of Hermes in the NAMA

- Ερμής της Αταλάντης (Greek)
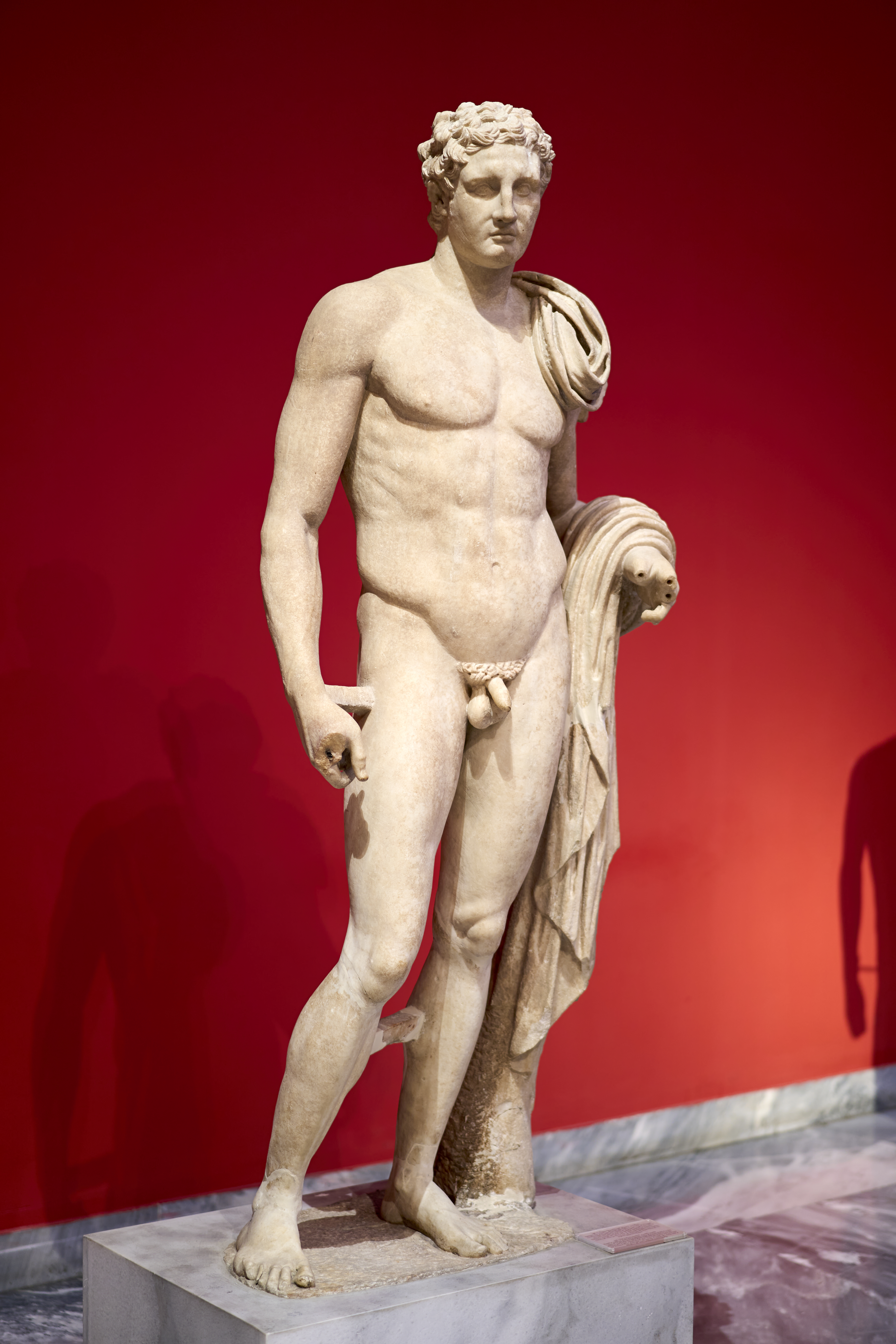
- The statue in the NAMA
- Year: 2nd century AD
- Catalogue: No 240
- Medium: Marble
- Movement: Roman-era classical imitation
- Subject: Youth as Hermes
- Dimensions: 190 cm (75 in)
- Condition: Nearly intact
- Location: National Archaeological Museum, Athens
- Owner: Greece
- Website: https://www.namuseum.gr/

The Atalante Hermes or Hermes of Atalante (Greek: Ερμής της Αταλάντης) is a marble funerary statue of a youth depicted as Hermes, the god of messengers and psychopomp of the dead. It was excavated in the town of Atalante in Phthiotis, in Greece. It is now kept in the Archaeological Museum of Athens with accession number 240.

== History ==
The statue was created as a funerary sculpture and placed in the tomb of a youth (hence the imagery of Hermes, a chthonic god who led the souls of the deceased to the Underworld) around the second century AD. It is either a copy of a statue of the fourth century BC, or heavily repeating that style. It was discovered in a small town called Atalante, after which it took its name, in Central Greece and was moved to Athens in the 1860s.

== Description ==
Hermes of Atalanta is preserved nearly intact, missing only the fingers of his left hand and the index finger of his right hand. It is over lifesize at 190 cm, and made of Pentelic marble.

Hermes/the youth stands in contrapposto, supporting most of his weight on his left foot, while his right leg is relaxed. He bears a chlamys draped over his left shoulder and wound over his arm, then falling on his back and hanging on the tree-trunk support, so that Hermes is mostly naked. Hermes's left arm is bent at the elbow, while his right one hangs freely at his side. He would have held objects in both hands, neither of which survive; his left hand probably held a caduceus, Hermes's most recognisable symbol, while his right a pouch.

His head has thick and tousled short locks of hair, and it slightly turned to his right. Although it was produced in the second century AD, it has some clear Lysippean characteristics, meaning it was either deliberately made in that style, or it is a copy of a fourth century BC statue. It has some common characteristics with similar statues of Hermes found in Andros (the Hermes of Andros) and Aegium (the Hermes of Aegium), only this one has been described as precise but also harsh and formal, lacking the naturalness, delicacy and grace of that of the one from Andros, though superior to the one from Aegium.

== See also ==
- Poseidon of Melos
- Aphrodite of Syracuse
- Bust of Hadrian (Piraeus)
- Hermes of Messene

== Bibliography ==
- Kaltsas, Nikolaos (2002). Sculpture in the National Archaeological Museum, Athens. Los Angeles, US: The J. Paul Getty Museum. ISBN 0-89236-686-9.
- Kavvadias, Panagiotis (1890). Γλυπτά του Εθνικού Μουσείου [Sculptures of the National Museum] (in Greek). Athens, Greece: S. K. Vlastos.
