= Hermes of Messene =

Roman statue of Hermes

- Greek: Ἑρμῆς τῆς Μεσσήνης
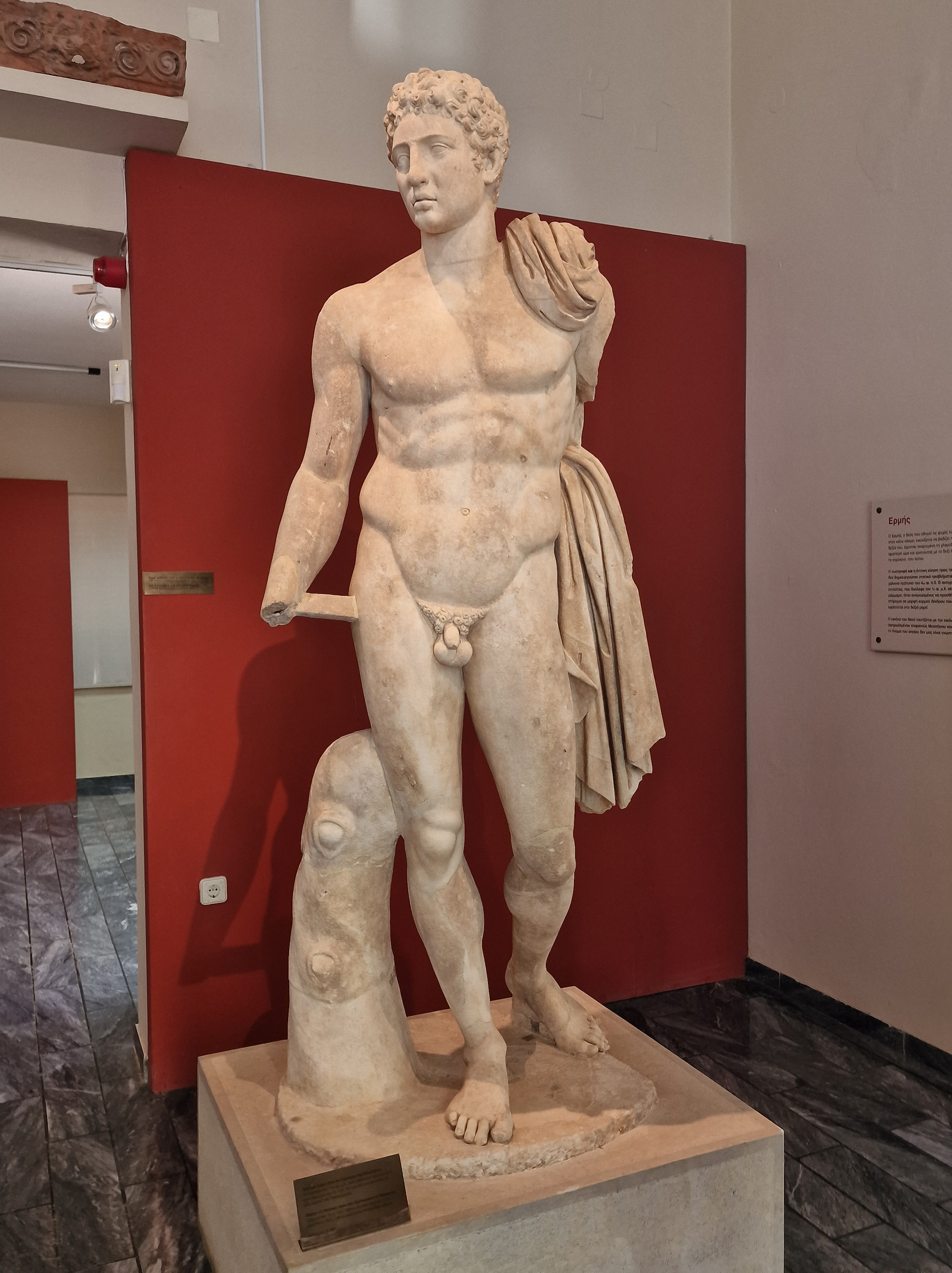
- The statue in the Museum of Messene
- Year: 1st century AD
- Medium: Marble
- Movement: Roman
- Subject: The god Hermes
- Dimensions: 208 cm (82 in)
- Condition: Right hand and left arm missing
- Location: Archaeological Museum of Messene, Messene
- Owner: Greece

The Hermes of Messene (Ancient Greek: Ἑρμῆς τῆς Μεσσήνης) is a large ancient Roman statue of the god Hermes, the Greek god of trade, commerce and messenger of the gods. It was found in 1996 in the old gymnasium of Ancient Messene, in southwestern Peloponnese, Greece, and now exhibited in the Archaeological Museum of Messene in the ancient site of Messene (not to be confused with the Archaeological Museum of Messenia in Kalamata).

== History ==
Hermes of Messene is dated to the first century AD, a Roman period copy of a previous Greek bronze original from the fourth century BC, a work of the school of the famous Greek sculptor Polyclitus. It was discovered in 1996, in room IX of the western stoa of the old gymnasium in ancient Messene, face down. It was transferred to the Archaeological Museum of Messene, where it is displayed to this day in Room A.

== Description ==
The statue is about 207 or 208 cm in height, and made of white marble that was probably sourced from the quarries of Thasos, an island in the northern Aegean Sea. The sculpture is thus a bit larger than lifesize. It is of similar type as another sculpture of the god discovered in Greece, the Hermes of Andros.

It was excavated in 37 different fragments which were pieced together during restoration works; the statue is preserved almost in its entirety, although Hermes's right hand and left arm below the elbow are not preserved. The Hermes of Messene is characterised by his balanced proportions and lovely features, a work of great value.

The youthful god is depicted naked, his head slightly inclined to his right, his hair combed in short curls. He is nude, as only his chlamys, gently draped over his shoulder, covers his naked body. The marble support of the statue here takes the shape of a short tree trunk.

== Restoration ==
The fragments were reassembled and attached with the use of white cement, with rods of titanium used to strengthen the reassembling. The conjoining points were sealed with either gypsum or polyester resin, while cracks were covered with acrylic paint of similar colour with the rest of the marble.

Α sedimentary crust of varying thickness had formed on the sculpture, especially on the anterior side (which was facing down in the soil). That crust was mostly made up of quartz, calcite and other soil components. The crust was removed and the statue was restored with a method of light amplification by stimulated radiation emission (laser), a process that took place on the island of Crete and lasted from February until March 2001. From underneath the thick crust, the sculpture's finer details were brought to light.

== See also ==
- Atalante Hermes
- Hermes and the Infant Dionysus
- Hermes Criophorus
- Hermes of Aegium

== Bibliography ==
- Galanou, Amerimne; Pouli, Paraskevi; Dogani, Ioanna (2001). "Ο Ερμής της Αρχαίας Μεσσήνης: Εφαρμογή τεχνολογίας Laser για απομάκρυνση ιζηματογενών αποθέσεων" [Hermes of Ancient Messene: Application of Laser Technology for the Removal of Sediments from White Marble] (PDF). Αρχαιολογία και Τέχνες [Archaeology and Arts] (in Greek). Archived from the original (PDF) on 2024-01-29.
