= Statuette of Mercury =

2nd-century family shrine statue of Mercury/Hermes in the MET

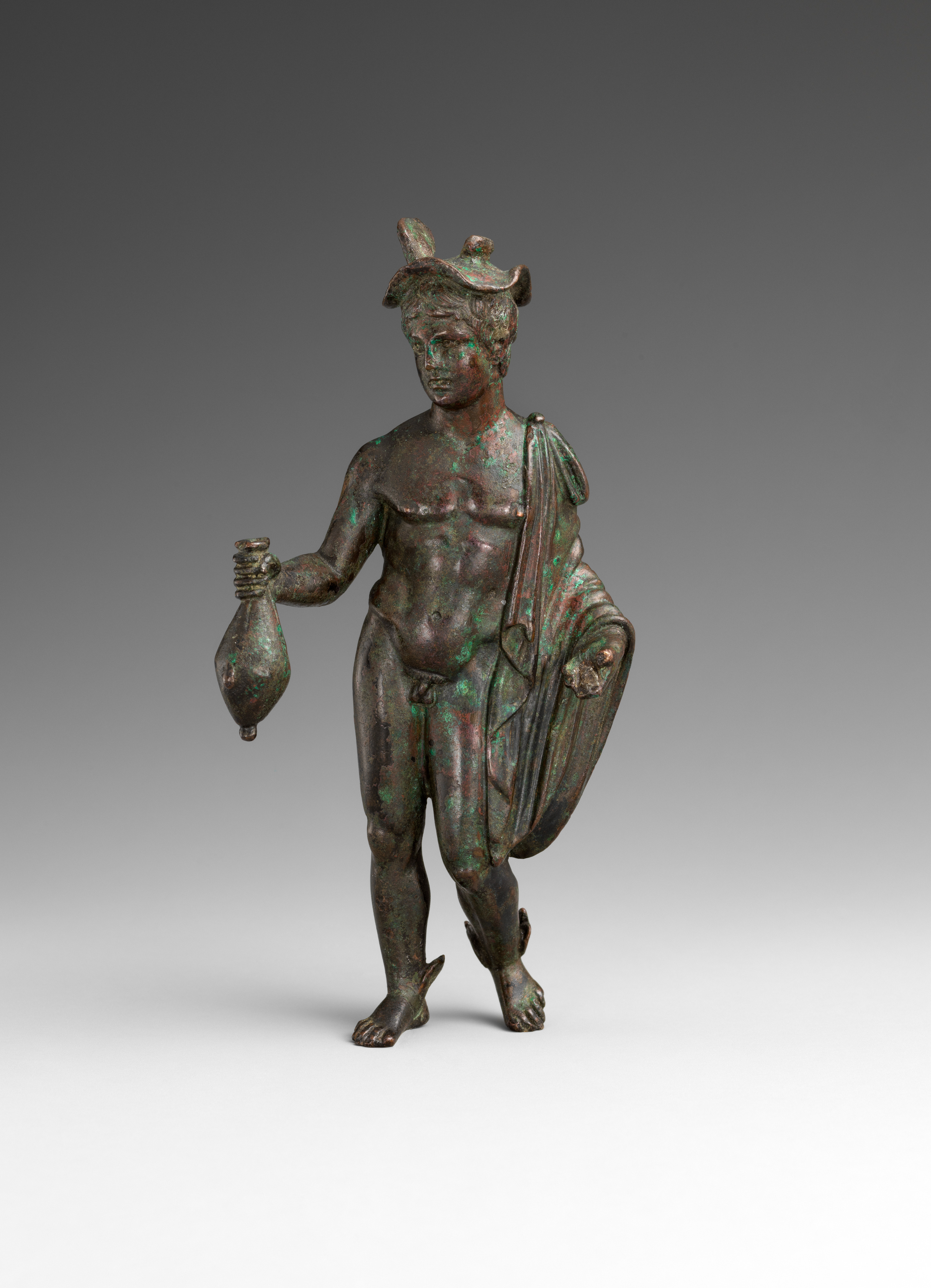
- Type: bronze statuette
- Material: Bronze
- Height: 12.7 cm
- Created: 2nd century CE
- Present location: Metropolitan Museum of Art, New York City
- Identification: 2023.561
- Culture: Roman
- https://www.metmuseum.org/art/collection/search/899859

The Statuette of Mercury is a Roman bronze statuette of the god Hermes created in the 2nd century CE. Acquired by the Metropolitan Museum of Art in 2023, it is among a set of similar set of figurines acquired throughout the museum's history to be of either Gallic or Italic origin that likely served as a figure of worship in family household shrines.

== Provenance ==
The statuette was first documented in 1873 in the collection of Francis Cook, 1st Viscount of Monserrate. Thereupon in 1882, it was listed in the catalogue Ancient Marbles in Great Britain by Adolf Michaelis.

In 1901, it was passed on to Wyndham Francis Cook (1860–1905), and thence by familial descent was sold at auction by Spink & Son on 14 July 1925. It was in the private collection of Patricia Knatchbull, 2nd Countess Mountbatten of Burma until 24 March 2021, whereupon it was acquired by dealer Charles Ede via Sotheby's to which the MET purchased the statuette from in 2023.

== Description ==
Hermes/Mercury is depicted as a naked young man, with his signature petasos and talaria. Standing forth on his right leg, his right hand produces a purse, while a chlamys is draped over his left shoulder. A caduceus was likely once present on the figure but it is no longer present.

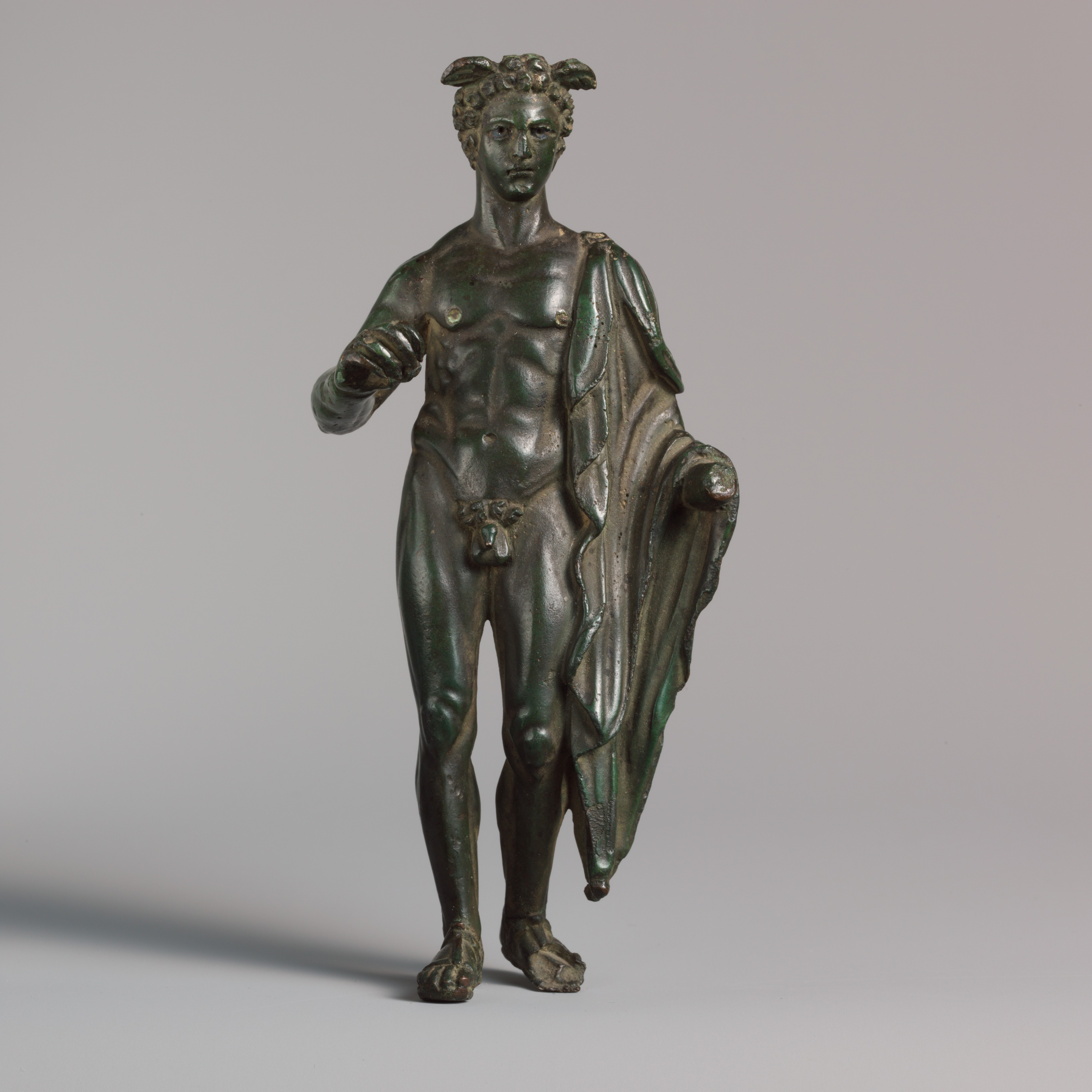
Versailleux Mercury, discovered in 1882, acquired by the MET in 1906.

The purse, or money pouch indicates fortune, and would be venerated in a household shrine. A similar statue in the MET (06.1057) was discovered in 1882 in Versailleux, France, depicting Mercury in a similar manner.

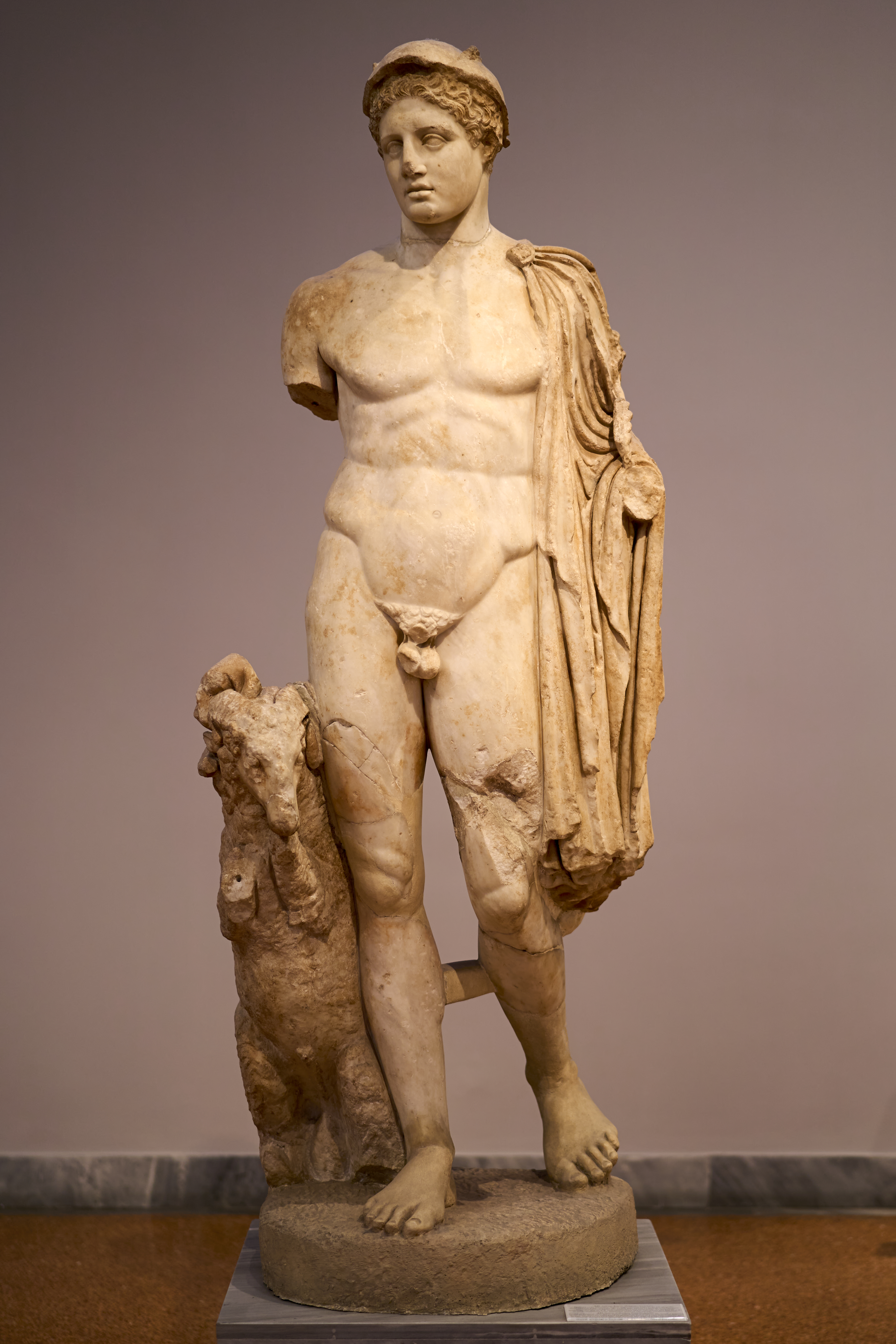
The Hermes Criophorus, based on the Greek original by Polykleitos

The god is posed in a balanced and casual position, the contrapposto, indicative of many other statuettes manufactured at the time in the 2nd century. They were modelled on the Greek originals like made by Polykleitos, such as that of the Hermes Criophorus, now at the National Archaeological Museum, Athens.
