= Bust of Hadrian (Piraeus) =

Marble statue of Hadrian

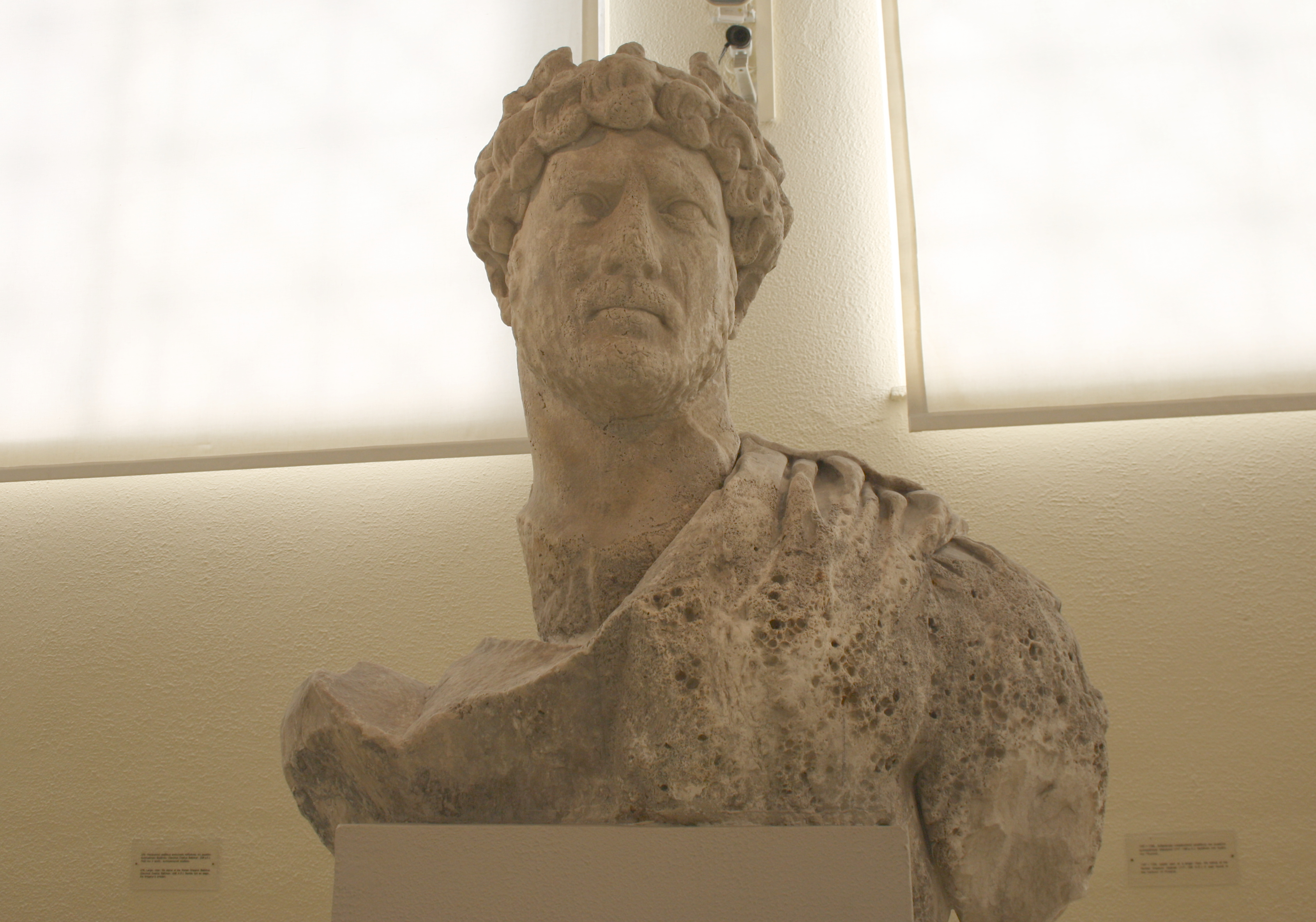
Statue of Hadrian.

The Portrait bust of Hadrian (Greek: Πορτραίτο του Αδριανού) is the surviving upper part of a colossal statue of Roman Emperor Hadrian (r. 117–138), now kept in the Archaeological Museum of Piraeus in Greece. It is the only colossal statue of the emperor in Greece today.

== History ==
Hadrian visited the city of Athens for the first time in 124 AD, and it was shortly after that visit that the statue was built. It has been associated with the Roman baths at 118 Kolokotroni Street, which stand at a distance of 100 m east of where the statue was found. Papastamos dates it to the last visit Hadrian paid Athens around 131 or 132 AD.

=== Discovery ===
The statue's remains were found in 1963 in the port of Piraeus underneath the Laimos building, at 35-39 Akti Miaouli Street. The sea shells stuck on its surface prove that the area found, just outside the wall, was under sea levels in ancient times.

== Description ==
This is a head with a total extant height of 1.48 m, a width of 98 cm and head height of 49 cm. According to calculations, the total height of the statue would have been around 3.20-3.30 m. It is made of Pentelic marble. The head and the front surface of the torso are much worn by sea erosion, with the exception of the back which is preserved in better condition. The right shoulder and large pieces of the right part of the chest are missing. The emperor was standing with his head turned slightly to the left. He is wearing a tunica, a small part of which can be seen on the back of his left arm. Above it he wore a breastplate, which is not preserved, and a paludamentum. To the left, two rows of fringed leather straps hang below the breastplate to protect the shoulder. The paludamentum is folded over the left shoulder and covers the entire back. The outline of the face is oval-shaped. His forehead is broad and the worn-out nose somewhat large, his eyes have no engraved details. The furrowed brows and tight lips give the face a certain seriousness, but also kindness and gentleness. The hair is combed forward from the top of the head. It ends in eight broad spiral cusps, combed to the left. The sturgeons above the forehead are larger than the rest, and Hadrian's beard is short. Since nothing is preserved from the right shoulder and arm, we cannot know what pose it had. The left hand probably held a sword and part of the paludamentum.

== Background ==
Hadrian of Piraeus is the only surviving (if partially) colossal statue of Hadrian in Greece. According to Pausanias, an over lifesize statue of the emperor stood behind the temple of Olympian Zeus in Athens, a gift from the Athenians dedicated to Hadrian's Greek policy and symbol of the citizens's gratitude for Hadrian's work in Athens. Since it was found in the port, perhaps it was meant to be taken abroad.

== Gallery ==
Bust of Hadrian

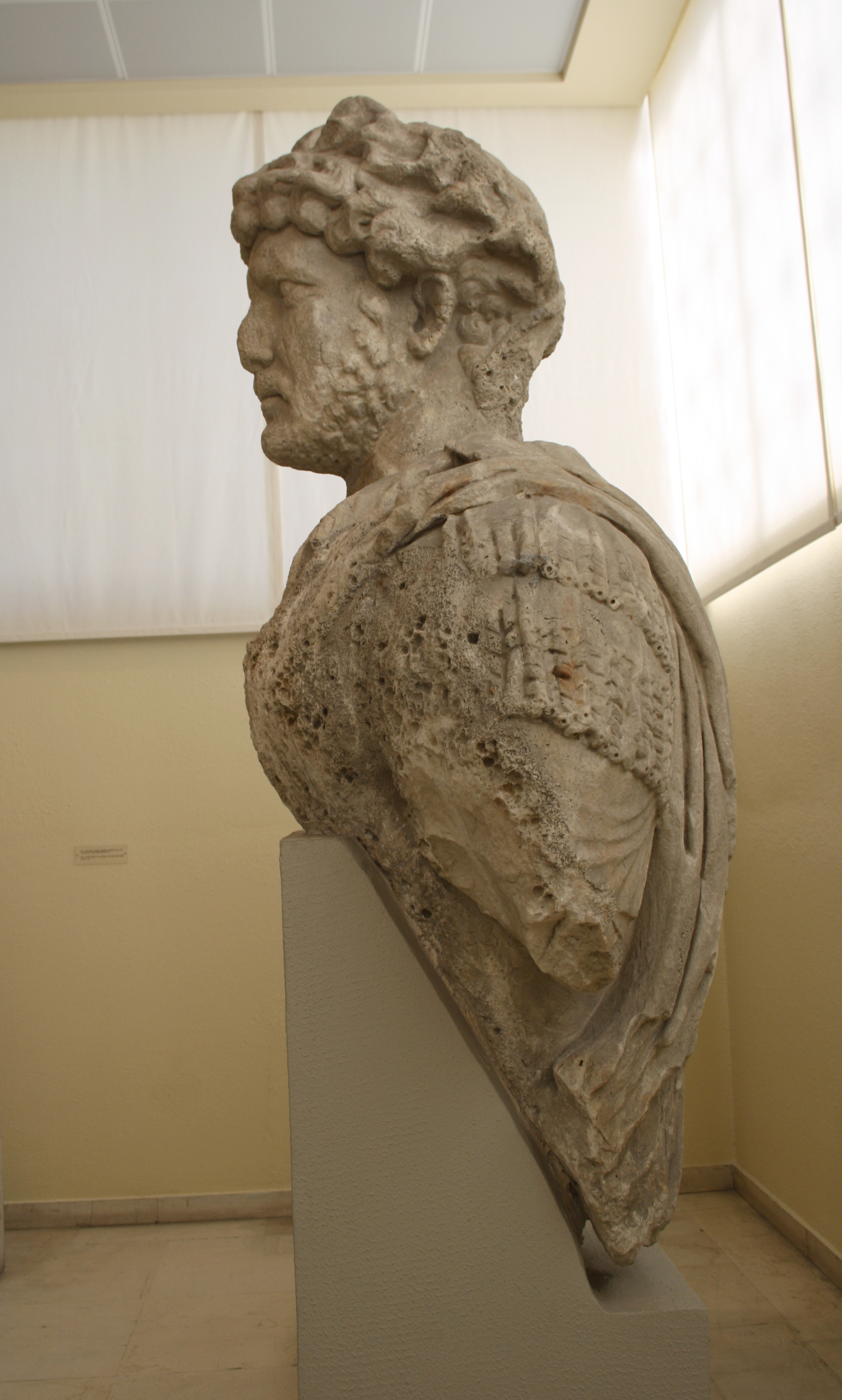
Left view

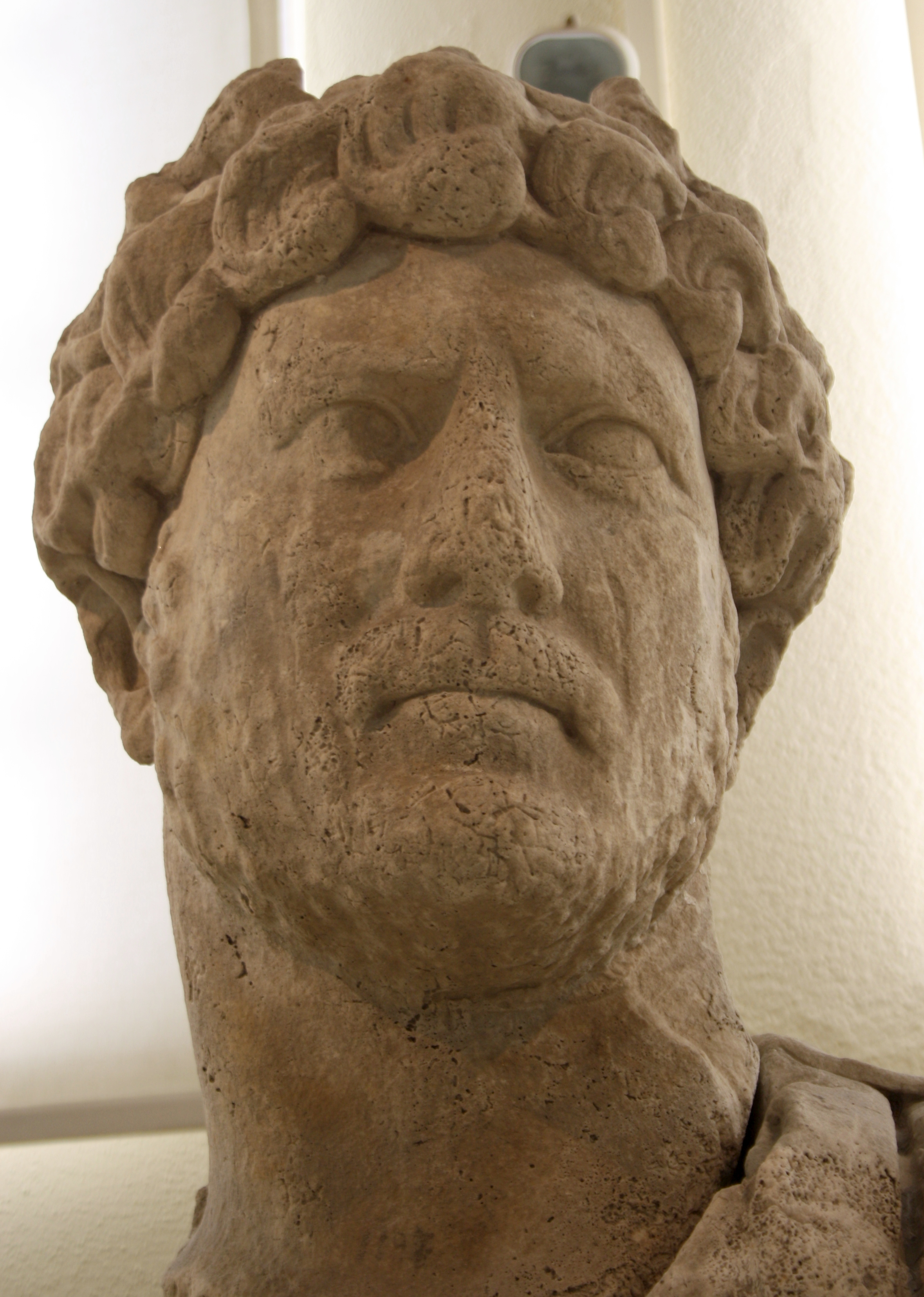
Head

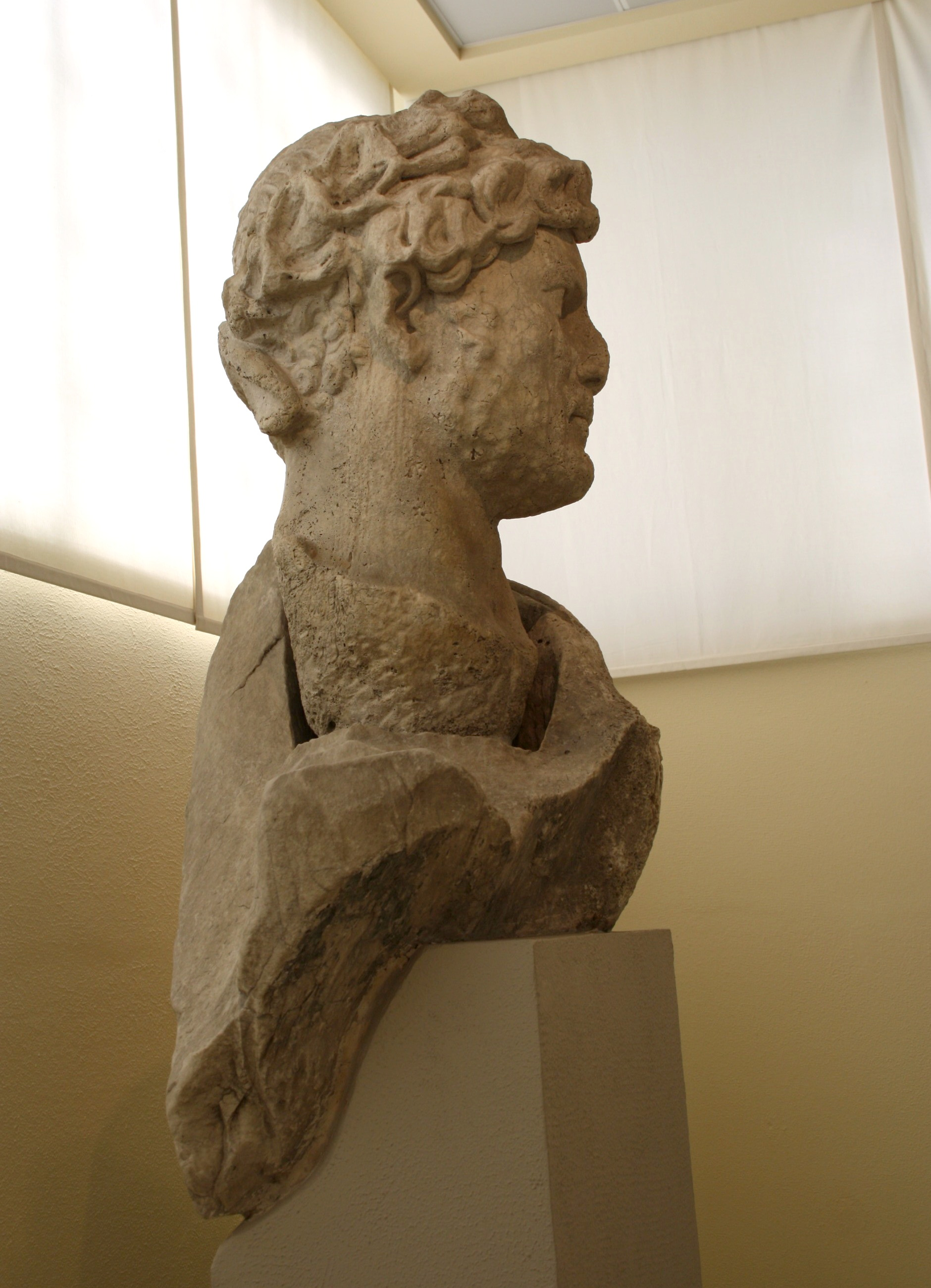
Right view

== See also ==
- Atalante Hermes
- Golden Bust of Septimius Severus
- Hermes Criophorus (Athens)

== Bibliography ==
- Zoridis, Pantelis (1982). "Δύο πορτραίτα του Ανδριανού του τύπου "rollockenfrisur" από τον Πειραιά και την Επίδαυρο". Αρχαιολογικά ανάλεκτα εξ' Αθηνών (in Greek). 15.
- Steinhauer, George (1998). Τα μνημεία και το Αρχαιολογικό Μουσειο του Πειραια (in Greek). Athens: Μ. Τουμπής, Α.Ε.
- Kallipolitis, Vasilis (1964). "Χρονικά". Αρχαιολογικόν Δελτίον (in Greek). 19.
- Papastamos, Demetrios (1972). "Αριστουργηματική κεφαλή του Αυτακρότορος Τραϊανού". Αρχαιολογικά ανάλεκτα εξ' Αθηνών (in Greek). 5.
