= Contrapposto =

Sculptural disposition of human figure

A marble copy of Polykleitos' Doryphoros, an early example of classical contrapposto.

S-curve (art)

Contrapposto (Italian pronunciation: [kontrapˈposto] 'counterpoise'), in the visual arts, is a human figure standing with most of its weight on one foot, so that its shoulders and arms twist off-axis from the hips and legs in the axial plane.

First appearing in Ancient Greece in the early 5th century BCE, contrapposto is considered a crucial development in the history of Ancient Greek art (and, by extension, Western art), as it marks the first time in Western art that the human body is used to express a psychological disposition. The style was further developed and popularized by sculptors in the Hellenistic and Imperial Roman periods, fell out of use in the Middle Ages, and was later revived during the Renaissance. Michelangelo's statue of David, one of the most iconic sculptures in the world, is a famous example of contrapposto.

== Definition ==
Contrapposto was historically an important sculptural development, for its appearance marks the first time in Western art that the human body is used to express a more relaxed psychological disposition. This gives the figure a more dynamic, or alternatively relaxed appearance. In the frontal plane this also results in opposite levels of shoulders and hips, for example: if the right hip is higher than the left; correspondingly the right shoulder will be lower than the left, and vice versa. It can further encompass the tension as a figure changes from resting on a given leg to walking or running upon it (so-called ponderation). The leg that carries the weight of the body is known as the engaged leg, the relaxed leg is known as the free leg. Usually, the engaged leg is straight, or very slightly bent, and the free leg is slightly bent. Contrapposto is less emphasized than the more sinuous S-curve, and creates the illusion of past and future movement. A 2019 eye tracking study, by showing that contrapposto acts as supernormal stimulus and increases perceived attractiveness, has provided evidence and insight as to why, in artistic presentation, goddesses of beauty and love are often depicted in contrapposto pose. This was later supported in a neuroimaging study. The term contrapposto can also be used to refer to multiple figures which are in counter-pose (or opposite pose) to one another.

== History ==
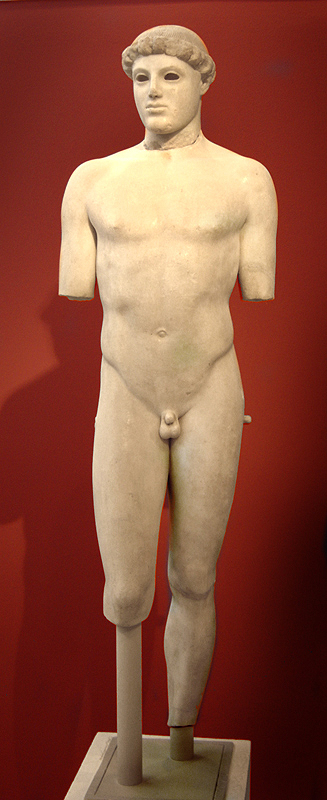
Kritios Boy. c. 480 BCE, was the first known Greek statue to use contrapposto.

=== Classical ===
Prior to the introduction of contrapposto, the statues that dominated ancient Greece were the archaic kouros (male) and the kore (female). The first known statue to use contrapposto is Kritios Boy, c. 480 BCE, so called because it was once attributed to the sculptor Kritios. British art historian Kenneth Clark called the statue "the first beautiful nude in art". The statue is a Greek marble original and not a Roman copy. It is possible, even likely, that earlier bronze statues had used the technique, but if they did, they have not survived.

According to the canon of the Classical Greek sculptor Polykleitos in the 4th century BCE, contrapposto is one of the most important characteristics of his figurative works and those of his successors, Lysippos, Skopas, etc. The Polykletian statues (Discophoros ("discus-bearer") and Doryphoros ("spear-bearer"), for example) are idealized athletic young men with the divine sense, and captured in contrapposto. In these works, the pelvis is no longer axial with the vertical kourous archaic style of earlier Greek sculpture before Kritios Boy.

Contrapposto can be clearly seen in the Roman copies of the statues of Hermes and Heracles. A famous example is the marble statue of Hermes and the Infant Dionysus in Olympia by Praxiteles. It can also be seen in the Roman copies of Polyclitus's Amazon.

Greek art emphasized humanism along with the human mind and the human body's beauty. Greek youths trained and competed in athletic contests in the nude. A great contribution to the contrapposto pose was the concept of a canon of proportions, in which mathematical properties are used to create proportions.

=== Renaissance ===
Classical contrapposto was revived in Renaissance art by the Italian artists Donatello and Leonardo da Vinci, followed by Michelangelo, Raphael and other artists of the High Renaissance. One of the achievements of the Italian Renaissance was the re-discovery of contrapposto.

=== Modern times ===
The technique continues to be widely employed in sculpture. Modern psychological research confirms the attractiveness of the pose.

== Examples ==
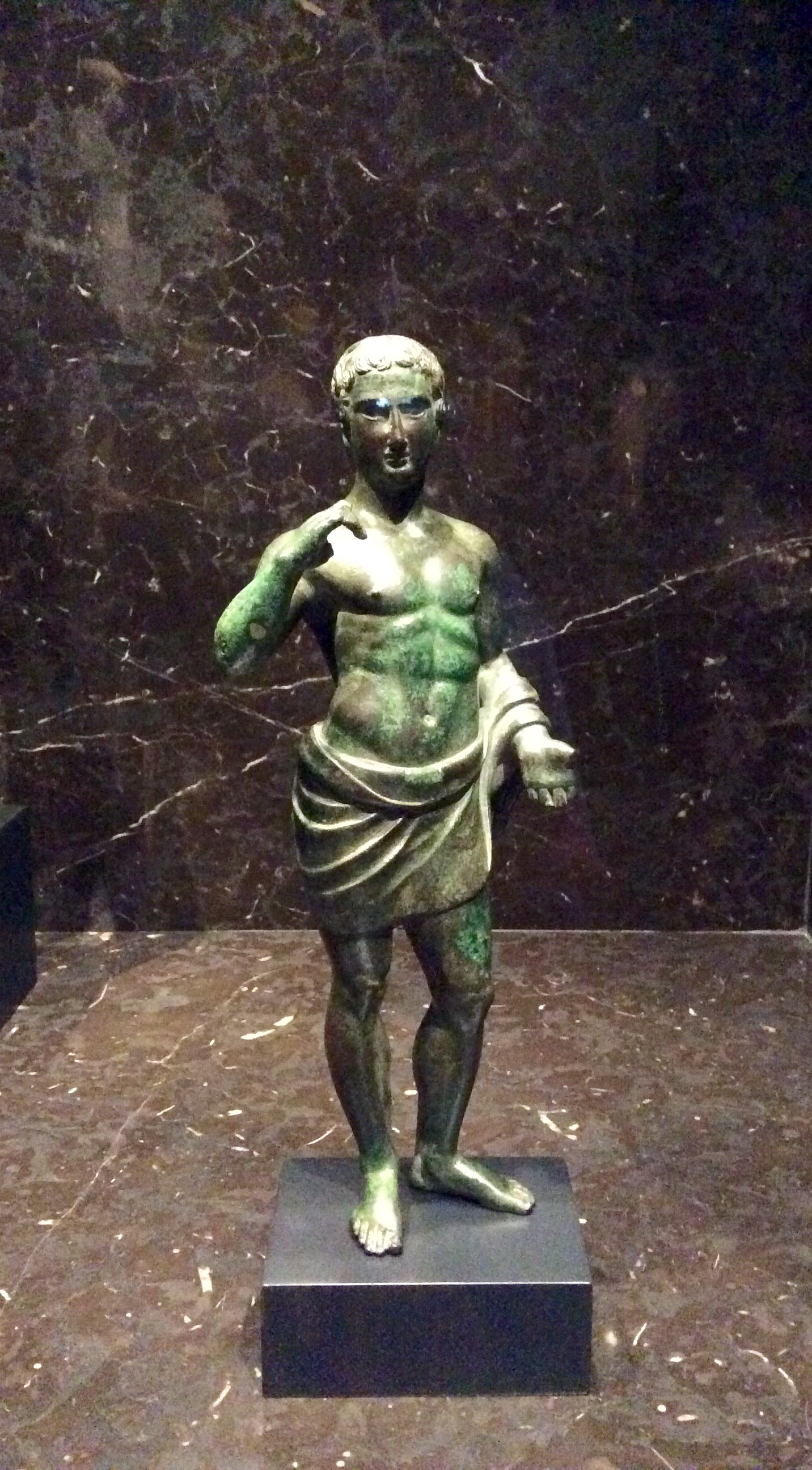
Etruscan statuette, from Italy, 3rd to 1st century BCE, bronze

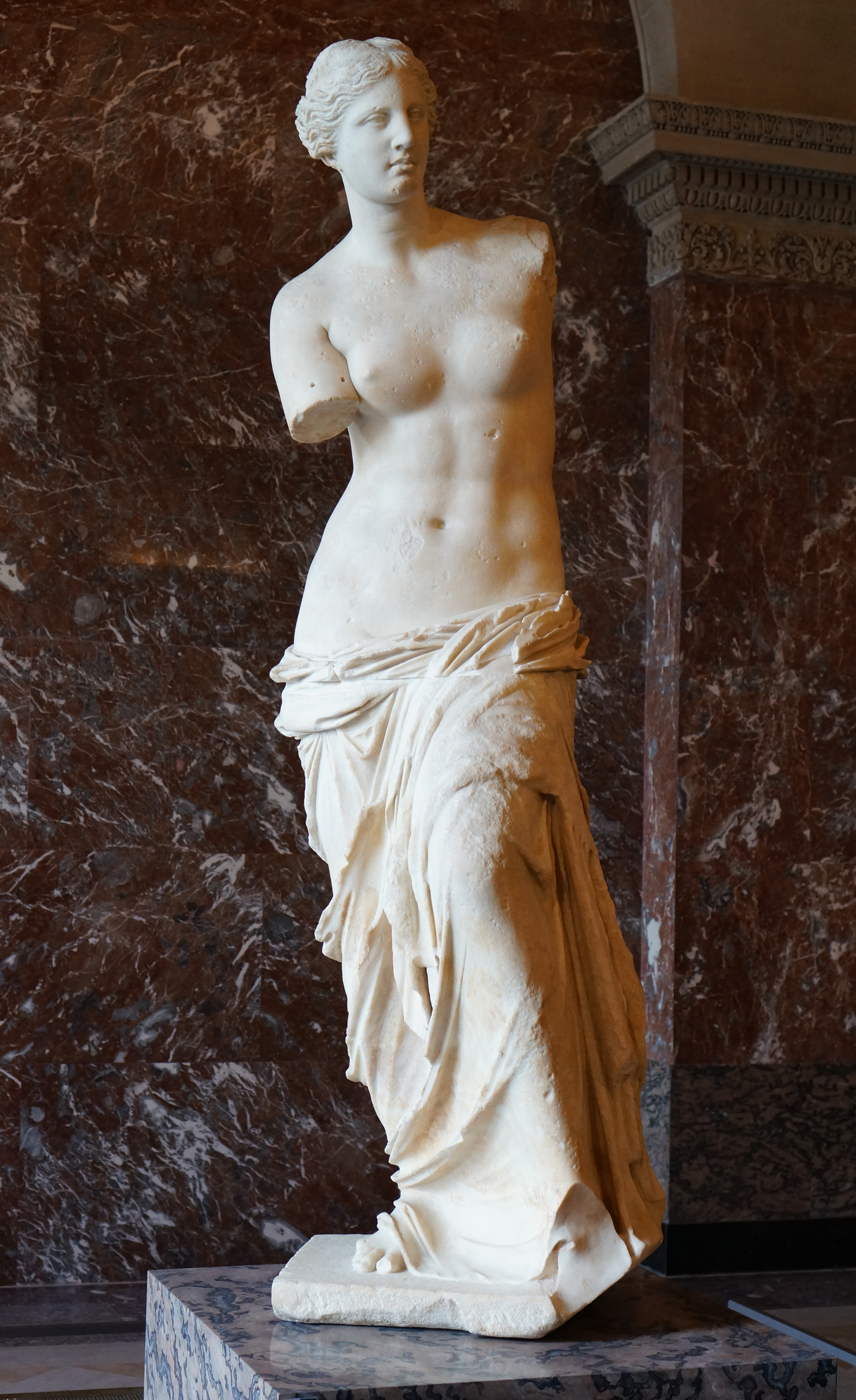
The Venus de Milo depicts an S-curve body shape. Greek, c. 130–100 BCE.

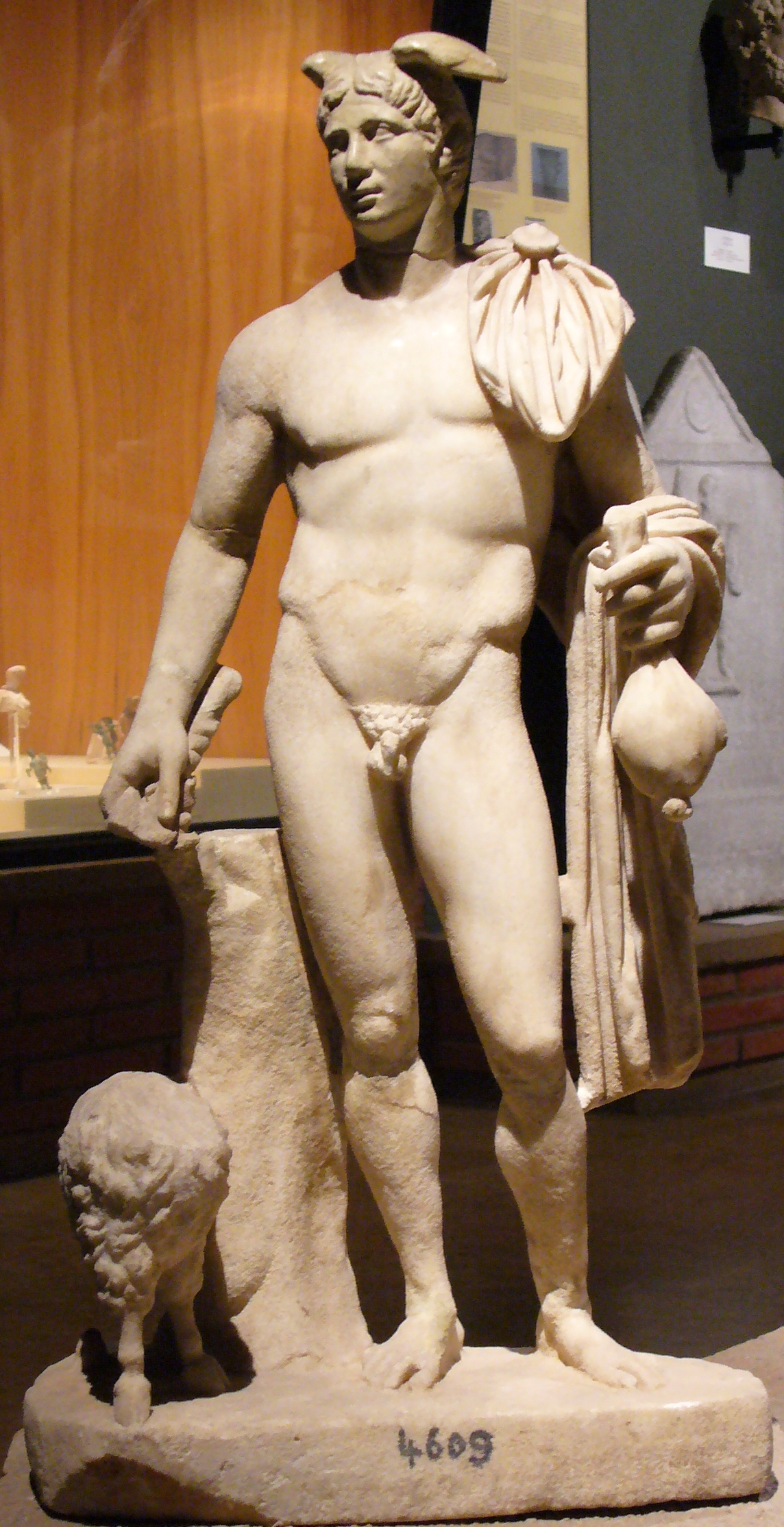
Hermes from Thrace, 2nd century

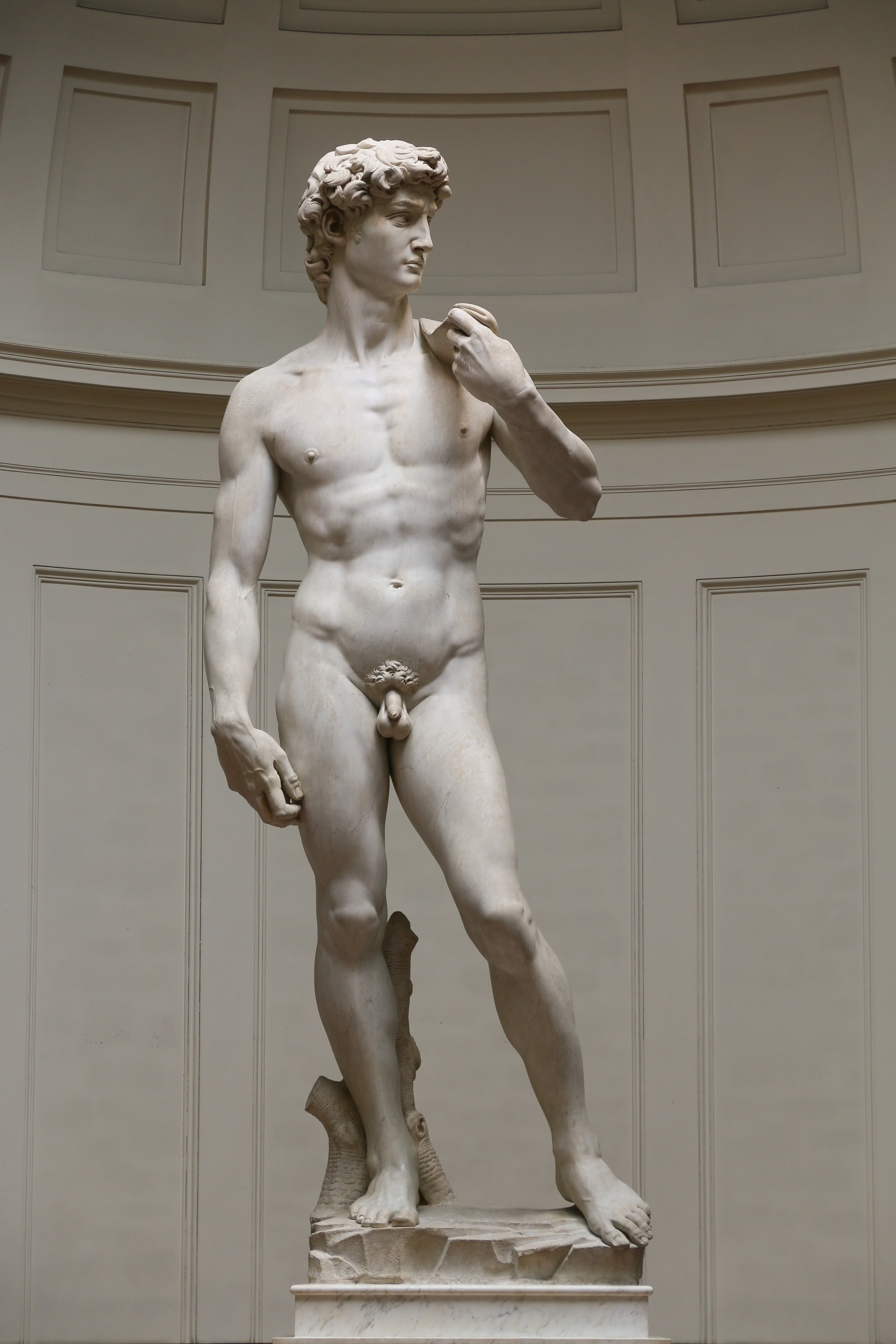
David, by Michelangelo, 1501–1504. The shoulders of the figure are seen to angle in one direction, the pelvis in another.

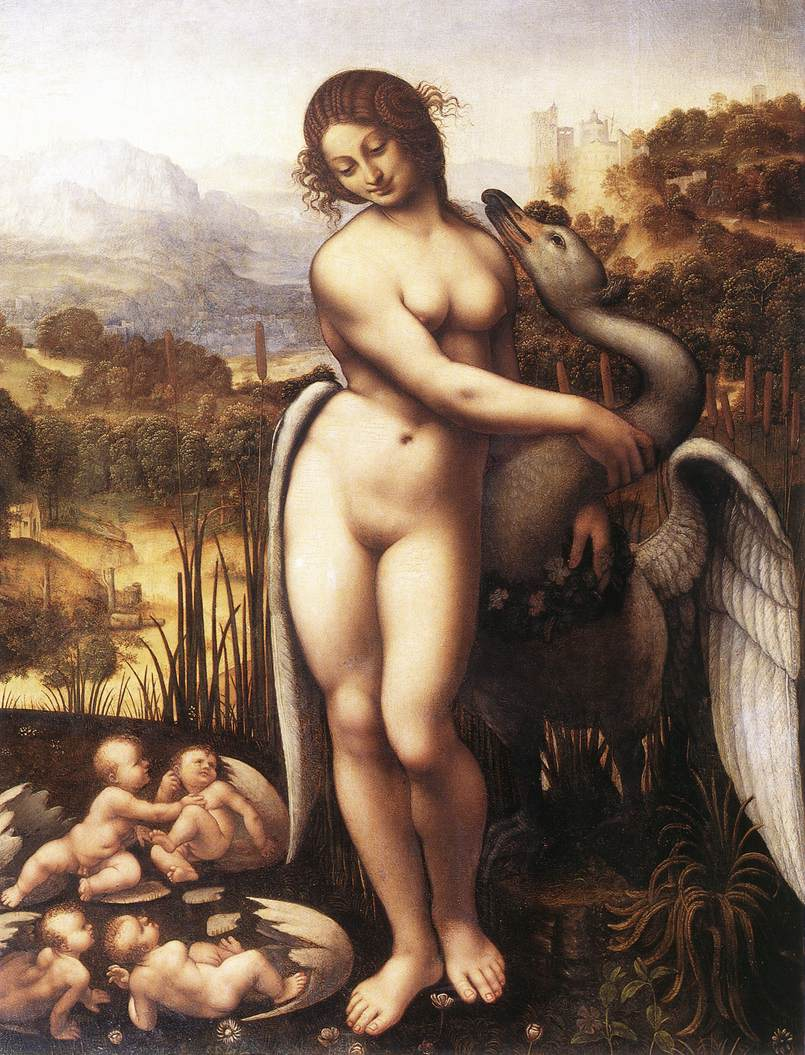
Leda and the Swan, copy by Cesare da Sesto after a lost original by Leonardo da Vinci, 1515–1520, oil on canvas, Wilton House, England.

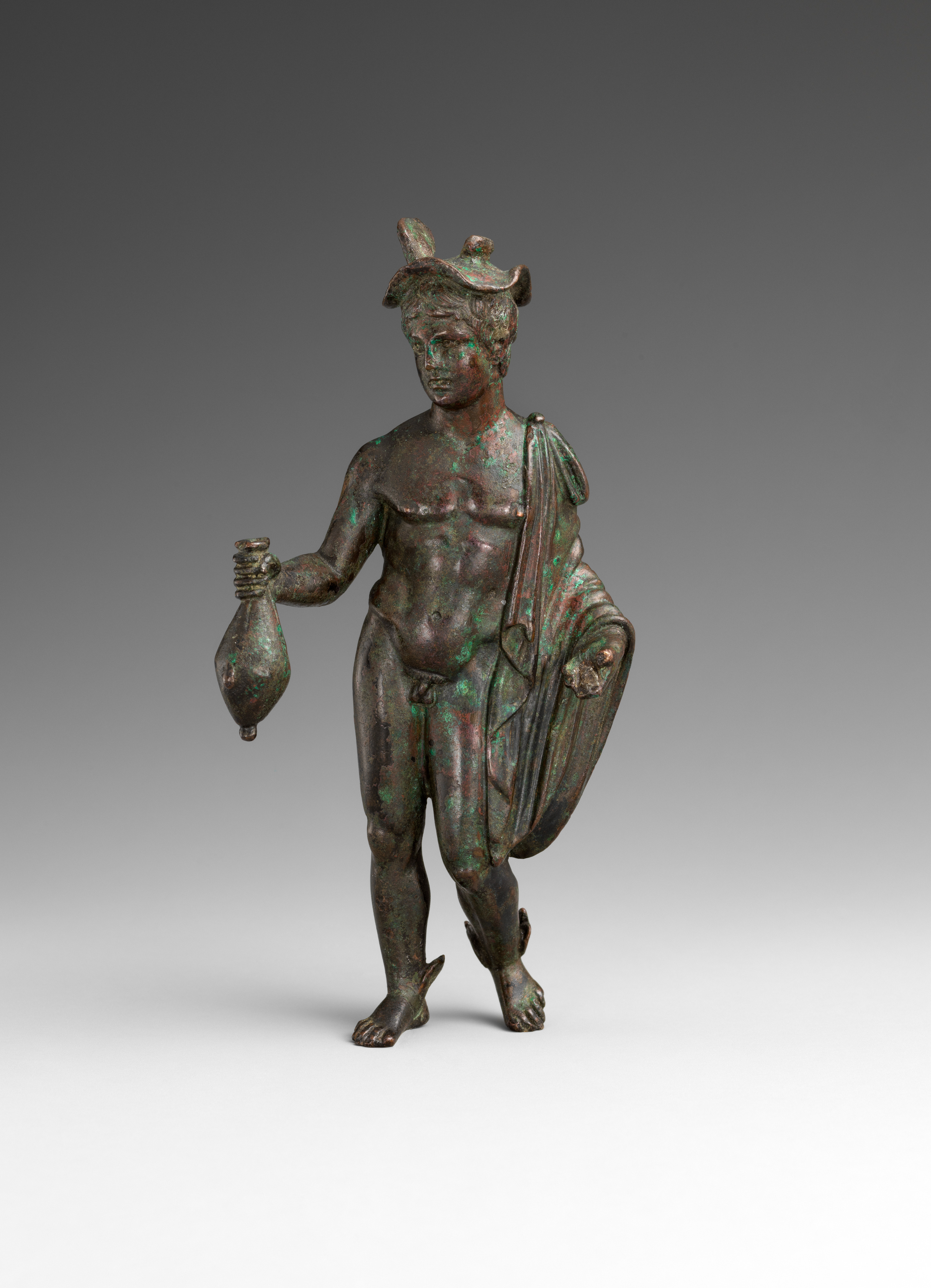
Statuette of Mercury, 2nd century AD, modelled on Polykleitos, Metropolitan Museum of Art

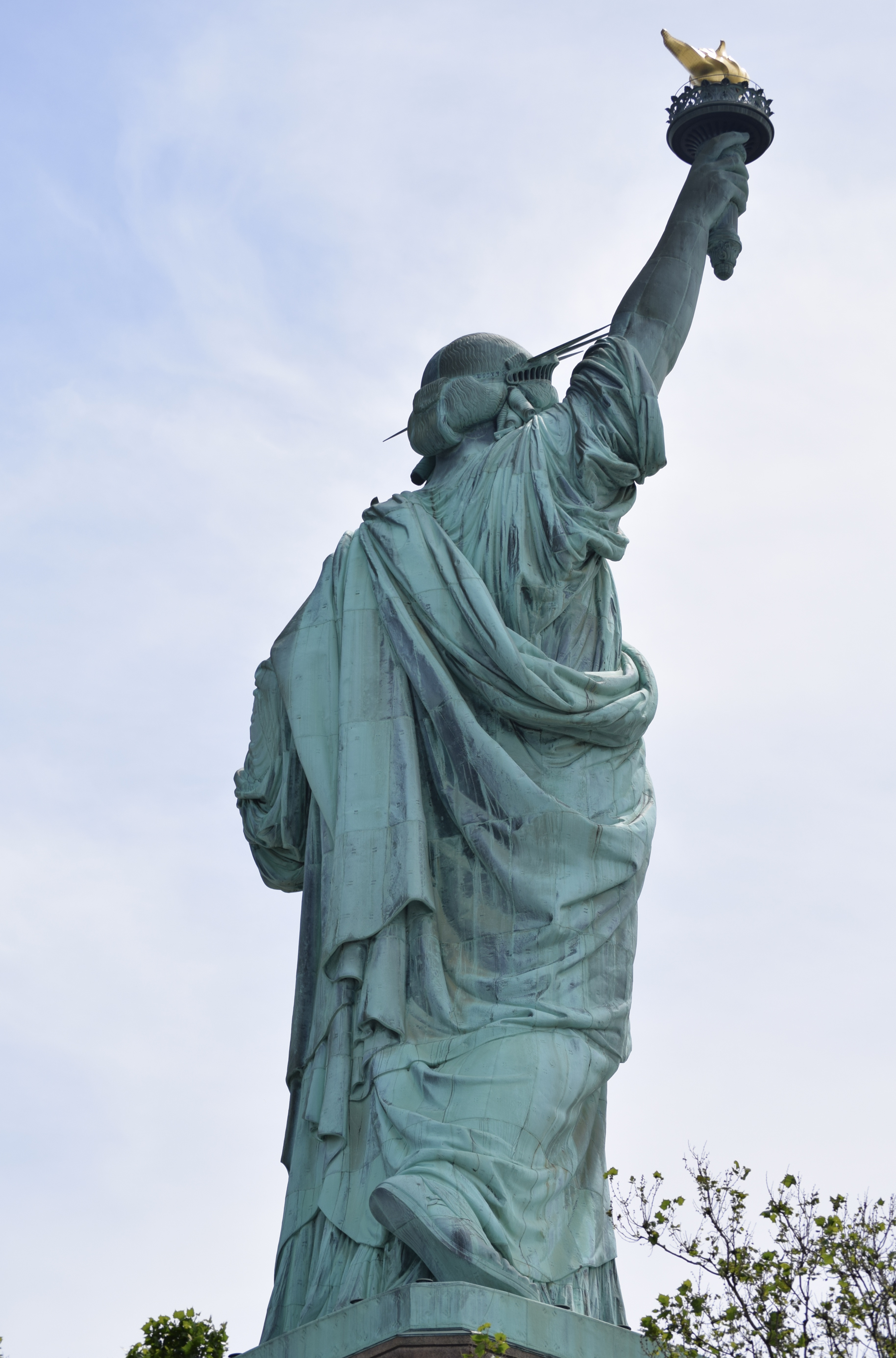
Statue of Liberty, 1886, copper on iron framework. Viewed from behind, showing the statue's contrapposto pose

== See also ==
- Greek statue
- Tribhanga, an Indian stance
- American lean

== References and sources ==
Sources

- Andrew Stewart, "Polykleitos of Argos", One Hundred Greek Sculptors: Their Careers and Extant Works, 16.72
- Polykleitos, The J. Paul Getty Museum (archived)
- Gardner, Percy (1911). "Polyclitus" . Encyclopædia Britannica. Vol. 22 (11th ed.). pp. 22–23.
- Understanding Contrapposto at Roberto Osti's Web Site
