= Nikolaos Kaltsas (archaeologist) =

Greek archaeologist and art historian

Nikolaos Kaltsas (Greek: Νικόλαος Καλτσάς; born in Dialambi, Rhodope) is a Greek classical archaeologist.

Kaltsas studied classical archaeology at the University of Thessaloniki, where he received his doctorate in 1985. Having already served as curator at the Archaeological Museum of Olympia (1981-1983), he became curator of the sculptural collection at the National Archaeological Museum of Athens and from 2002 to 2012 was director of the museum. He is a corresponding member of the German Archaeological Institute.

== Selected publications ==
- Olympia, Archaeological Receipts Fund, Athens 1997.
- Τα γλυπτά. Εθνικό Αρχαιολογικό Μουσείο, κατάλογος, Kapon, Athen 2001, ISBN 960-7037-09-X.
  - Translated as: Sculpture in the National Archaeological Museum, Athens, The J. Paul Getty Museum, Los Angeles 2002 ISBN 0-89236-686-9.
- "Die Kore und der Kouros aus Myrrhinous." Antike Plastik 28, Hirmer, München 2002, pp. 7–39.
- The National Archeological Museum, National Archaeological Museum, Athen 2007. Online
- with Alan Shapiro. Worshiping Women. Ritual and Reality in Classical Athens, Onassis Foundation, New York 2008.
- with Alan Shapiro: The Feminine and the Sacred in Ancient Athens, Onassis Foundation, New York 2010.
