= Cittacotte =

Miniature terracotta models of buildings

Cittacotte: Palermo's Porta Nuova represented in three phases of the making process

The cittacotte are miniature copies of historical or monumental buildings of Palermo and other Italian cities made only in terracotta. The word cittacotte was invented by Vincenzo Vizzari, and it is composed by the two terms: città (city) and cotte (baked), meaning they are miniatures made of fired clay.

The monuments are reproduced in scale (1:180 and 1:350) and can vary in size from a minimum height of 1.5 cm (0.59 in) up to 60 cm (24 in). The typology of monuments and buildings reproduced is varied: monumental city doors, churches, historical buildings, but also common buildings of the centre of the city.

== Making the Cittacotte ==
Cittacotte: Palermo's Porta Nuova already finished with the casts in the background

The preparatory phase of a single cast is long and laborious: it consists in creating some clay prototypes which will be necessary to make their plaster casts. Each cast is made by photographic and metric surveys that allow the artist to take care also of the shrinkage coming from the evaporation during the modelling and the cooking phases. The result is a perfect handcrafted masterpiece in scale 1:350 or 1:180, exact in each single particular.

The cast or the casts, for more complex models, are used to give a first shape to the clay parts that, once sketched, can be modelled and finished by hand. The making of a medium complexity model like the Palermo's Porta Nuova can require six hours of intense manual labour. The firing takes about two hours. After that the artist can start the finishing, fully manually, and the polishing using a little wax film to enhance the appearance of the terracotta.

Cittacotte: making of Palermo's Porta Nuova in six shots

Phase 1 - putting the clay in the casts

Phase 2 - the first raw part of the model is ready

Phase 3 - assembling all the parts of the model together

Phase 4 - after the baking the terracotta is ready

Phase 5 - finishing, polishing and waxing

Phase 6 - the cittacotte miniature is ready

== Vincenzo Vizzari ==
Vincenzo Vizzari

Vincenzo Vizzari is an architect from Palermo. Since 1993, he has been working as a full-time artist and artisan in his little workshop in Corso Vittorio Emanuele in Palermo. In his life he made a radical choice and that choice led him to specialize in the creation of cittacotte, finally joining his love for architecture together with his love for making in an artisan way.

== Collecting ==
There is an emerging hobby devoted to collecting cittacotte due to some miniatures being made in limited editions. In addition, it is possible to realize large parts of Sicilian towns by putting together the reproductions of these buildings.

Composition of catoi (typical Sicilian low cost building of 1500

== See also ==
- Clay
- Clay modeling
- Terracotta
