= Terracotta =

Clay-based earthenware used for sculpture

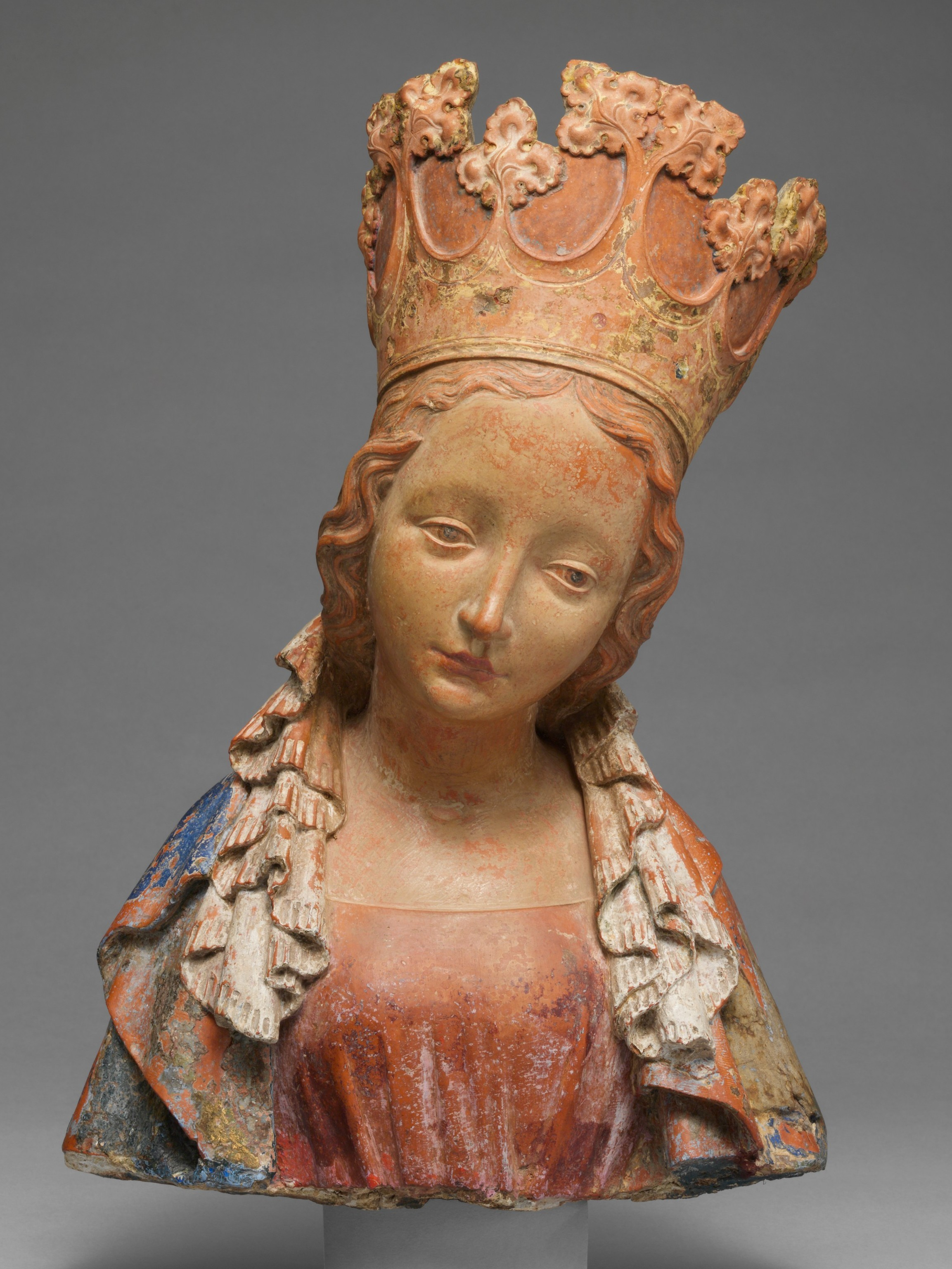
International Gothic Bohemian bust of the Virgin Mary; c. 1390–1395; terracotta with polychromy; 32.5 × 22.4 × 13.8 cm

Terracotta, also known as terra cotta or terra-cotta (Italian: [ˌtɛrraˈkɔtta]; lit. 'baked earth'; from Latin terra cocta 'cooked earth'), is a clay-based non-vitreous ceramic fired at relatively low temperatures. The term is used for earthenware objects of certain types, as set out below.

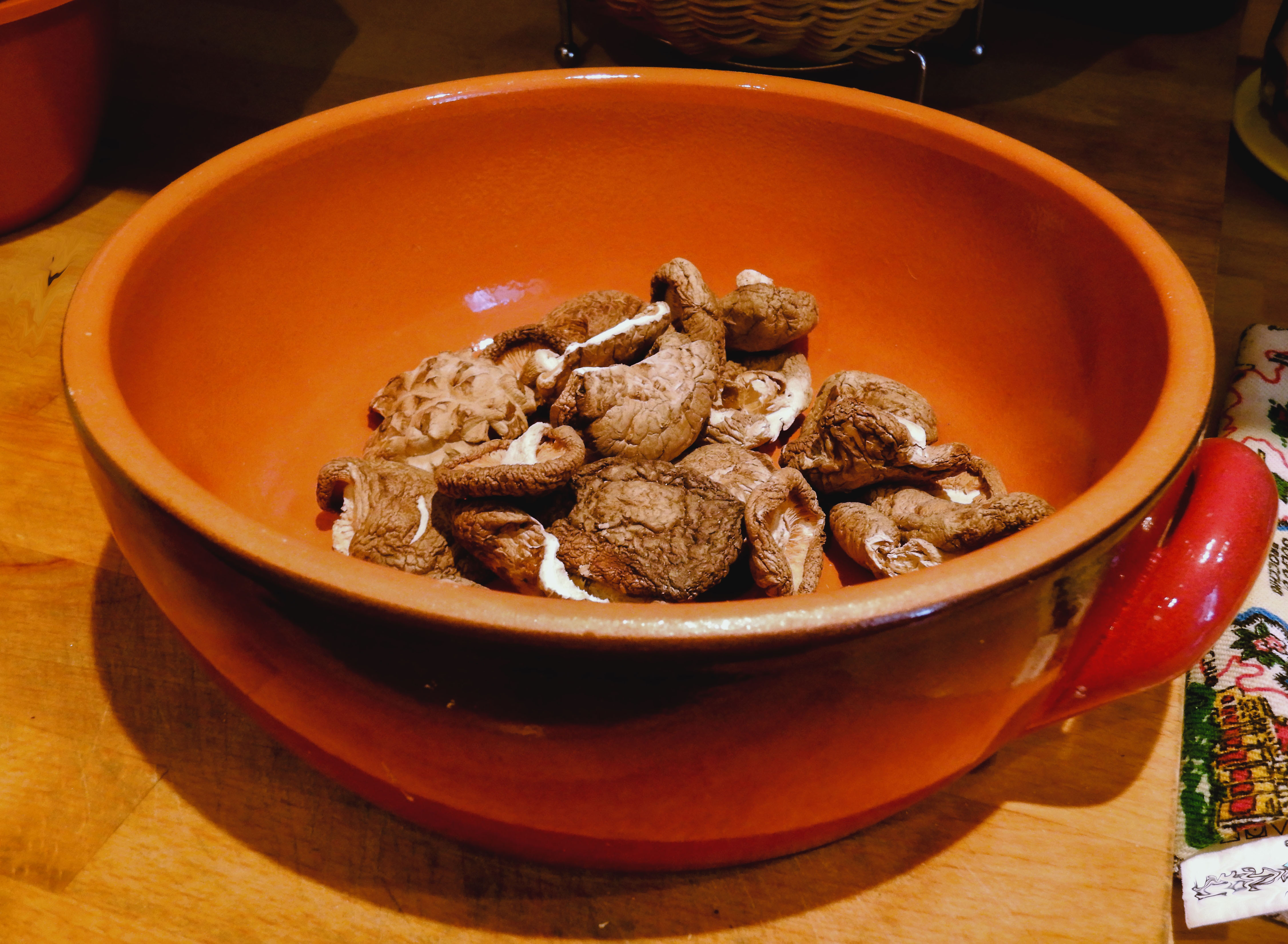
A glazed terracotta casserole dish

Usage and definitions of the term vary, such as:

- In art, pottery, applied art, and craft, terracotta is a term often used for red-coloured earthenware sculptures or functional articles such as flower pots, water and waste water pipes, and tableware.
- In archaeology and art history, terracotta is often used to describe objects such as figurines and loom weights not made on a potter's wheel, with vessels and other objects made on a wheel from the same material referred to as earthenware; the choice of term depends on the type of object rather than the material or shaping technique.
- Terracotta is also used to refer to the natural brownish-orange color of most terracotta.
- In architecture, the term encompasses many building materials made of fired ceramic for exterior covering. Architectural terracotta can also refer to ornate decorative ceramic elements such as antefixes and revetments, which had a large impact on the appearance of temples and other buildings in the classical architecture of Europe, as well as in the Ancient Near East.

This article covers the sense of terracotta referring to a medium in sculpture, as in the Terracotta Army and Greek terracotta figurines, and architectural decoration. Neither pottery such as utilitarian earthenware nor East Asian and European sculpture in porcelain are covered.

== In art history ==
=== Asia and the Middle East ===
Terracotta female figurines were uncovered by archaeologists in excavations of Mohenjo-daro, Pakistan (3000–1500 BCE). Along with phallus-shaped stones, these suggest some sort of fertility cult. The Burney Relief is an outstanding terracotta plaque from Ancient Mesopotamia of about 1950 BCE. In Mesoamerica, the great majority of Olmec figurines were in terracotta. Many ushabti mortuary statuettes were also made of terracotta in Ancient Egypt.

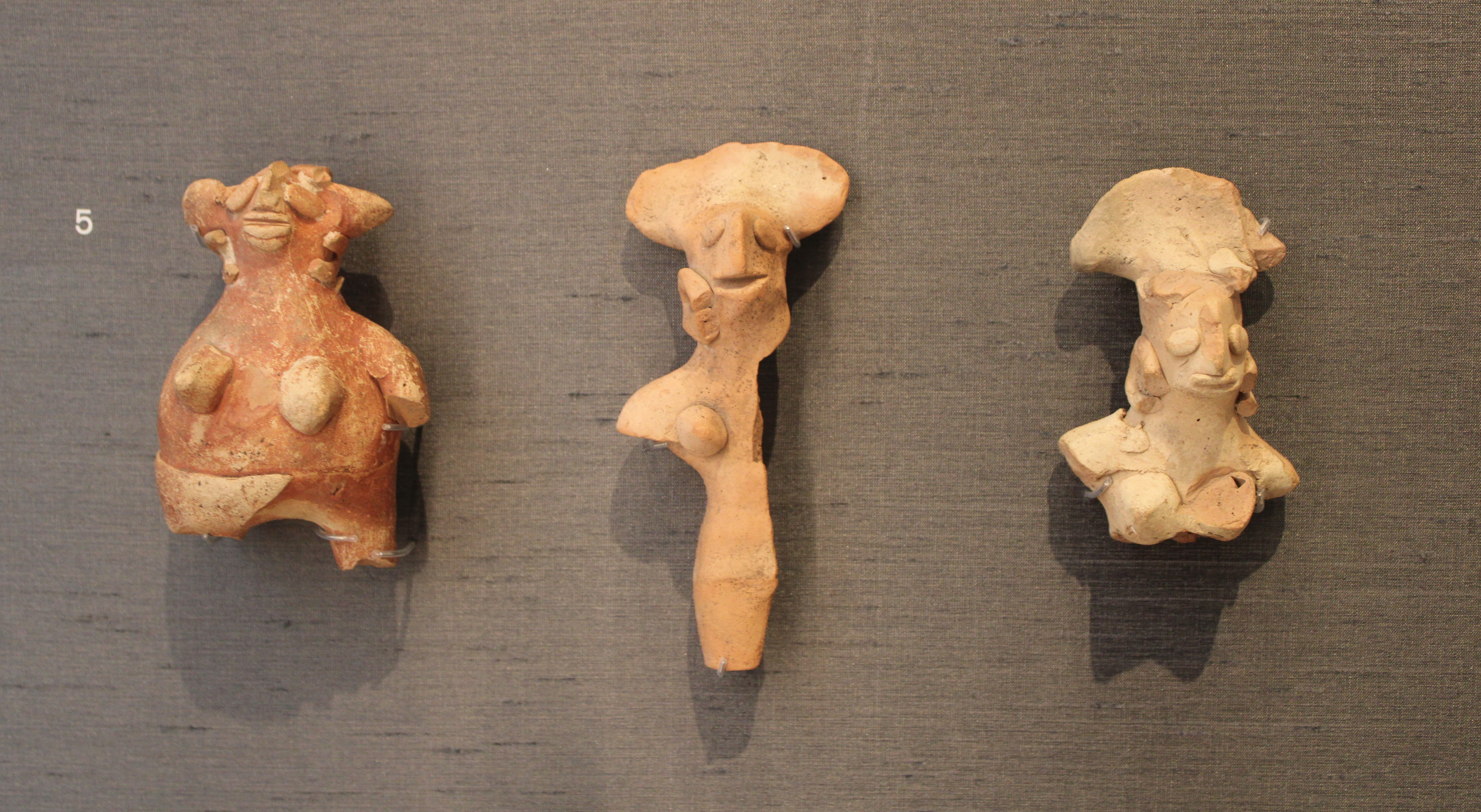
Fragments of female terracotta figurines. Handmade, with appliquéd ornaments, especially elaborate coiffures and fan-shaped headdresses. From Mohenjo-daro (Pakistan), Mature Harappan Period (c. 2600–1900 BCE). British Museum.

==== India ====
Terracotta has been a medium for art since the Harappan civilization, although techniques used differed in each time period. In the Mauryan times, they were mainly figures of mother goddesses, indicating a fertility cult. Moulds were used for the face, whereas the body was hand-modelled. In the Shungan times, a single mould was used to make the entire figure and depending upon the baking time, the colour differed from red to light orange. The Satavahanas used two different moulds- one for the front and the other for the back and kept a piece of clay in each mould and joined them together, making some artefacts hollow from within. Some Satavahana terracotta artefacts also seem to have a thin strip of clay joining the two moulds. This technique may have been imported from the Romans and is seen nowhere else in the country.

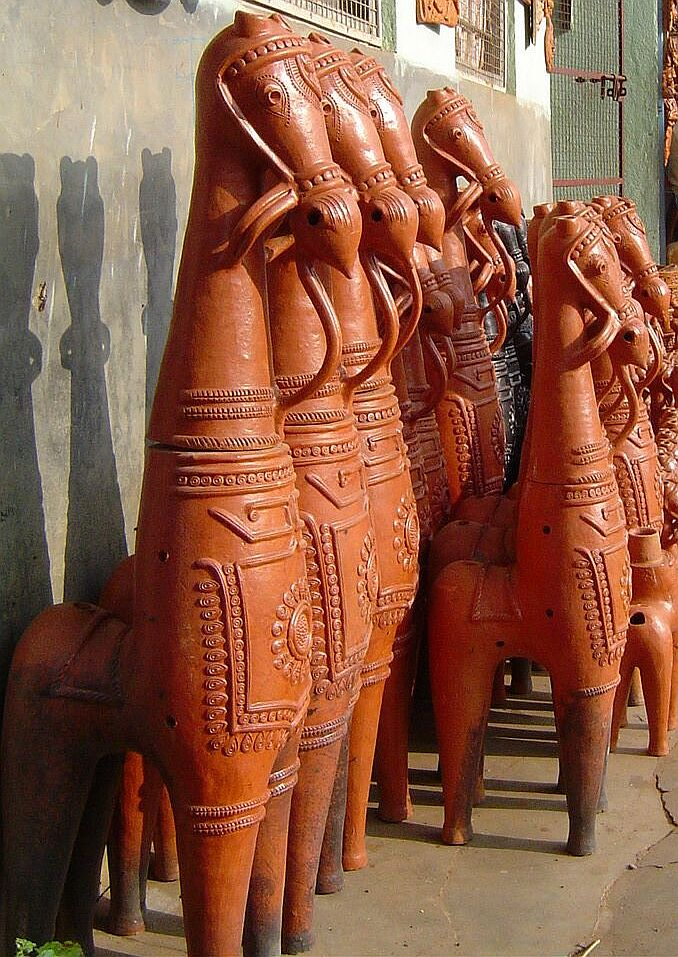
Terracotta horses from Bishnupur, Bankura

Contemporary centres for terracotta figurines include West Bengal, Bihar, Jharkhand, Rajasthan and Tamil Nadu. In Bishnupur, West Bengal, the terracotta pattern–panels on the temples are known for their intricate details. The Bankura Horse is also very famous and belongs to the Bengal school of terracotta. Madhya Pradesh is one of the most prominent production centres of terracotta art today. The tribes of the Bastar have a rich tradition. They make intricate designs and statues of animals and birds. Hand-painted clay and terracotta products are produced in Gujarat. The Aiyanar cult in Tamil Nadu is associated with life-size terracotta statues.

Traditional terracotta sculptures, mainly religious, also continue to be made. The demand for this craft is seasonal, reaching its peak during the harvest festival, when new pottery and votive idols are required. During the rest of the year, the makers rely on agriculture or some other means of income. The designs are often redundant as crafters apply similar reliefs and techniques for different subjects. Customers suggest subjects and uses for each piece.

To sustain the legacy, the Indian Government has established the Sanskriti Museum of Indian Terracotta in New Delhi. The initiative encourages ongoing work in this medium through displays terracotta from different sub-continent regions and periods. In 2010, the India Post Service issued a stamp commemorating the craft which shows a terracotta doll from the craft museum.

==== China ====
Chinese sculpture made great use of terracotta, with and without glazing and color, from a very early date. The famous Terracotta Army of Emperor Qin Shi Huang, 209–210 BCE, was somewhat untypical, and two thousand years ago reliefs were more common, in tombs and elsewhere. Later Buddhist figures were often made in painted and glazed terracotta, with the Yixian glazed pottery luohans, probably of 1150–1250, now in various Western museums, among the most prominent examples. Brick-built tombs from the Han dynasty were often finished on the interior wall with bricks decorated on one face; the techniques included molded reliefs. Later tombs contained many figures of protective spirits and animals and servants for the afterlife, including the famous horses of the Tang dynasty; as an arbitrary matter of terminology these tend not to be referred to as terracottas.

=== Africa ===
Precolonial West African sculpture also made extensive use of terracotta. The regions most recognized for producing terracotta art in that part of the world include the Nok culture of central and north-central Nigeria, the Ife-Benin cultural axis in western and southern Nigeria (also noted for its exceptionally naturalistic sculpture), and the Igbo culture area of eastern Nigeria, which excelled in terracotta pottery. These related, but separate, traditions also gave birth to elaborate schools of bronze and brass sculpture in the area.

=== Europe ===
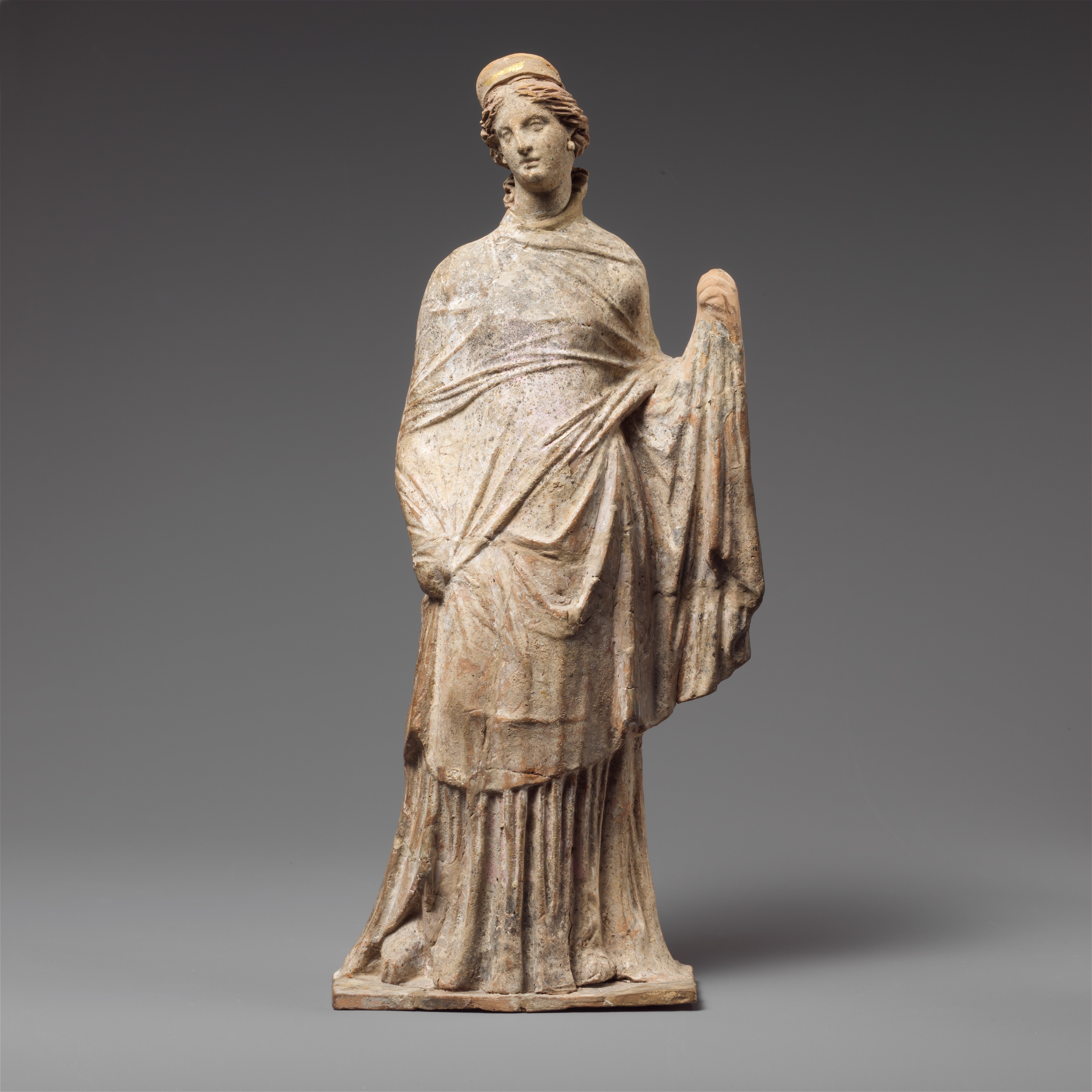
Tanagra figurine, 2nd century BCE; height: 29.2 cm

The Ancient Greeks' Tanagra figurines were mass-produced mold-cast and fired terracotta figurines, that seem to have been widely affordable in the Hellenistic period, and often purely decorative in function. They were part of a wide range of Greek terracotta figurines, which included larger and higher-quality works such as the Aphrodite Heyl; the Romans too made great numbers of small figurines, which were often used in a religious context as cult statues or temple decorations. Etruscan art often used terracotta in preference to stone even for larger statues, such as the near life-size Apollo of Veii and the Sarcophagus of the Spouses. Campana reliefs are Ancient Roman terracotta reliefs, originally mostly used to make friezes for the outside of buildings, as a cheaper substitute for stone.

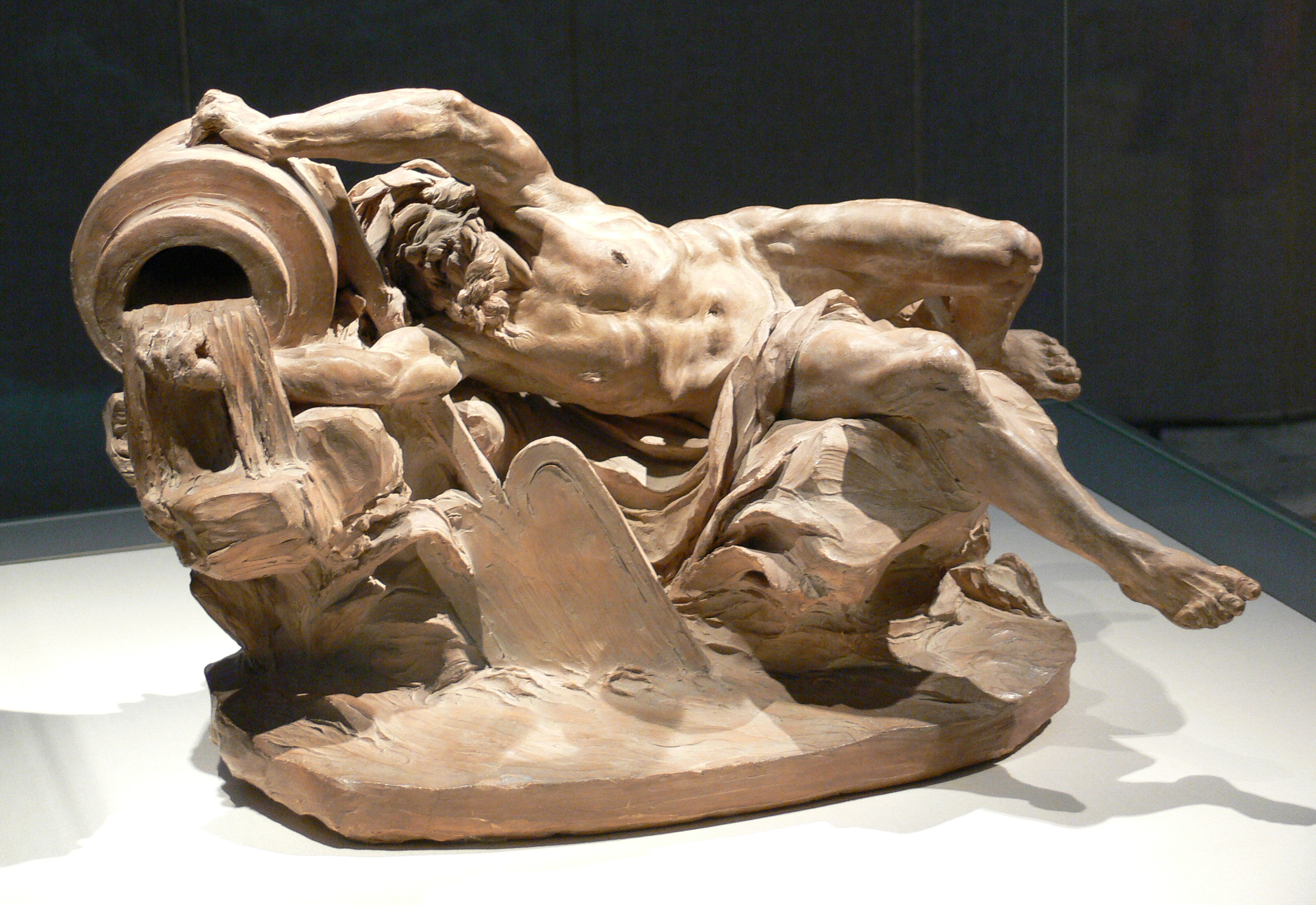
The River Rhine Separating the Waters; by Claude Michel; 1765; terracotta; 27.9 × 45.7 × 30.5 cm; Kimbell Art Museum (Fort Worth, Texas, US)

European medieval art made little use of terracotta sculpture, until the late 14th century, when it became used in advanced International Gothic workshops in parts of Germany. The Virgin illustrated at the start of the article from Bohemia is the unique example known from there. A few decades later, there was a revival in the Italian Renaissance, inspired by excavated classical terracottas as well as the German examples, which gradually spread to the rest of Europe. In Florence, Luca della Robbia (1399/1400–1482) was a sculptor who founded a family dynasty specializing in glazed and painted terracotta, especially large roundels which were used to decorate the exterior of churches and other buildings. These used the same techniques as contemporary maiolica and other tin-glazed pottery. Other sculptors included Pietro Torrigiano (1472–1528), who produced statues, and in England busts of the Tudor royal family. The unglazed busts of the Roman Emperors adorning Hampton Court Palace, by Giovanni da Maiano, 1521, were another example of Italian work in England. They were originally painted but this has now been lost from weathering.

In the 18th-century unglazed terracotta, which had long been used for preliminary clay models or maquettes that were then fired, became fashionable as a material for small sculptures including portrait busts. It was much easier to work than carved materials, and allowed a more spontaneous approach by the artist. Claude Michel (1738–1814), known as Clodion, was an influential pioneer in France. John Michael Rysbrack (1694–1770), a Flemish portrait sculptor working in England, sold his terracotta modelli for larger works in stone, and produced busts only in terracotta. In the next century the French sculptor Albert-Ernest Carrier-Belleuse made many terracotta pieces, but possibly the most famous is The Abduction of Hippodameia depicting the Greek mythological scene of a centaur kidnapping Hippodameia on her wedding day.

== Architecture ==
=== History ===
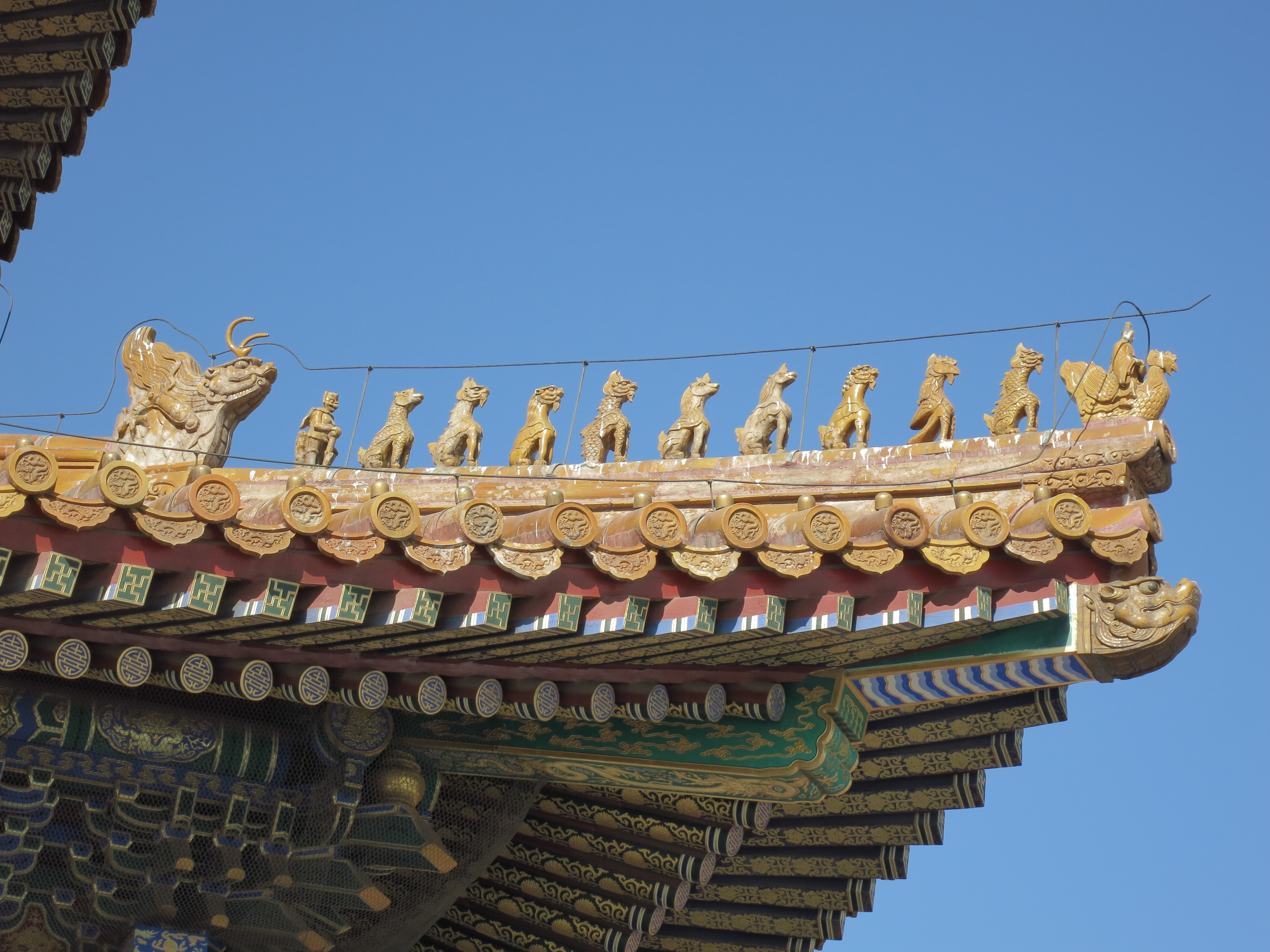
Imperial roof decoration in the Forbidden City

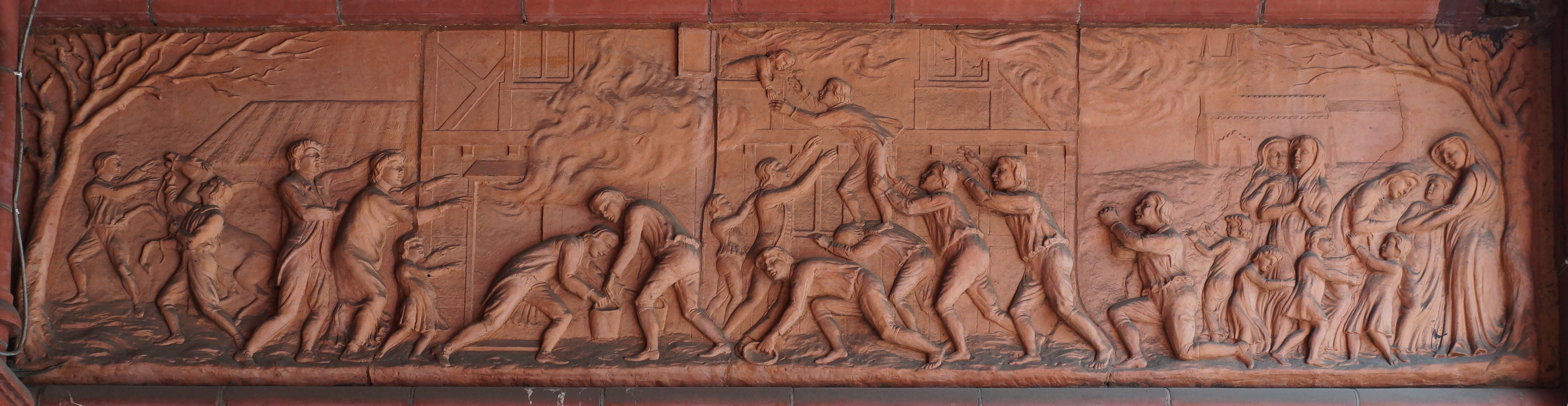
One of two terracotta relief sculptures, "Events in the Life of John Wesley", in the porch of Methodist Central Hall, Birmingham, England

Architectural terracotta is a broad term encompassing a wide ranging variety of clay-based architectural elements such as wall reliefs, decorative roof elements, and architectural sculpture.

Many ancient and traditional roofing styles included more elaborate sculptural elements than the plain roof tiles, such as Chinese Imperial roof decoration and the antefix of western classical architecture. In India West Bengal made a speciality of terracotta temples, with the sculpted decoration from the same material as the main brick construction.

Architectural terracotta experienced a resurgence in western architecture starting in the mid-19th century. Starting in Europe, architects designed elaborate buildings relying on terracotta detailing for their facades. James Taylor was one of the first producers of architectural terracotta to find success in the United States, using his experience manufacturing the material in England to guide his work in North America.

The Great Chicago Fire of 1871 led to increased demand for fireproof materials in urban settings, and helped drive the following push for architectural terracotta throughout North America. The material remained popular through the early 1900s, with its versatility allowing it to support a variety of architectural styles such as Rennaissance revival, neo-Gothic, and Art deco.

Emerging trends in Modernist architecture favoring the use of concrete and glass significantly reduced demand for architectural terracotta starting in the 1930s. In the time since, the material has experienced a resurgence of interest, favored for work in postmodern and revivalist architectural styles.

=== Differences from non-architectural terracotta ===
Unlike art and pottery terracotta, clays used for architectural terracotta can range from dark-bodied stonewares to light-bodied whitewares, ranging depending on what is required for their particular application.

The clays are usually fired to or near vitrification in order to survive continued exposure to harsh outdoor conditions such as freeze-thaw cycles and salt intrusion. Contrary to popular belief, glazing does not seal terracotta from water penetration and a non-porous clay body is necessary to prevent failure from these issues.

== Production ==
Prior to firing, terracotta clays are easy to shape. Shaping techniques include throwing, slip casting as well as others.

After drying, it is placed in a kiln or, more traditionally, in a pit covered with combustible material, then fired. The typical firing temperature is around 1,000 °C (1,830 °F), though it may be as low as 600 °C (1,112 °F) in historic and archaeological examples. During this process, the iron oxides in the body reacts with oxygen, often resulting in the reddish colour known as terracotta. However, color can vary widely, including shades of yellow, orange, buff, red, pink, grey or brown.

A final method is to carve fired bricks or other terracotta shapes. This technique is less common, but examples can be found in the architecture of Bengal on Hindu temples and mosques.

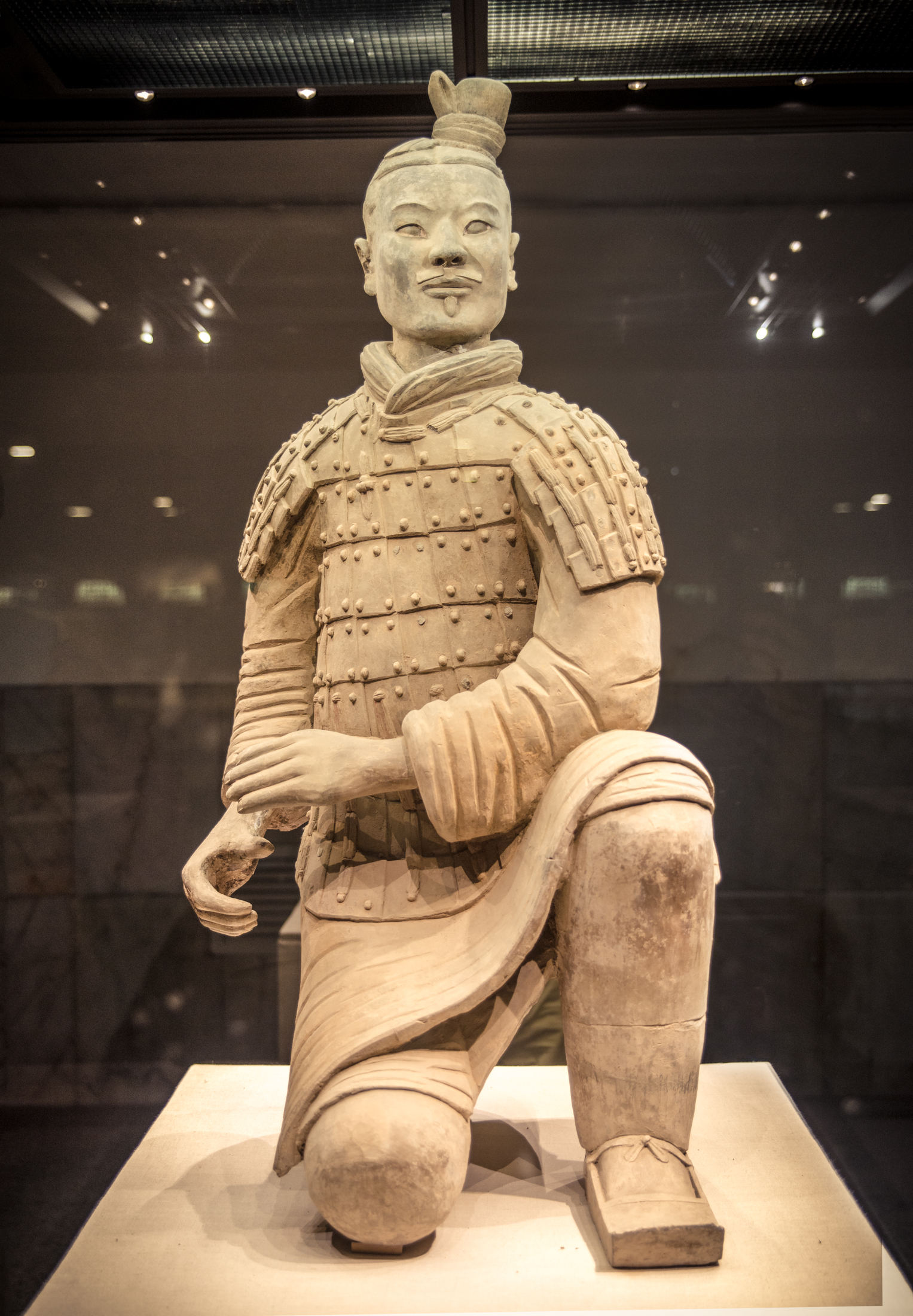
One of the warriors of the Terracotta Army, mould-made Ancient Chinese terracotta sculptures of the armies of Qin Shi Huang, the first Emperor of China

== Properties ==
Terracotta is not watertight, but its porousness decreases when the body is surface-burnished before firing. Glazes can be used to decrease permeability and hence increase watertightness.

Unglazed terracotta is suitable for use below ground to carry pressurized water (an archaic use), for garden pots and irrigation or building decoration in many environments, and for oil containers, oil lamps, or ovens. Most other uses require the material to be glazed, such as tableware, sanitary piping, or building decorations built for freezing environments.

Terracotta will also ring if lightly struck, as long as it is not cracked.

Painted (polychrome) terracotta is typically first covered with a thin coat of gesso, then painted. It is widely used, but only suitable for indoor positions and much less durable than fired colors in or under a ceramic glaze. Terracotta sculptures in the West were rarely left in their "raw" fired state until the 18th century.

=== Advantages in sculpture ===
As compared to bronze sculpture, terracotta uses a far simpler and quicker process for creating the finished work with much lower material costs. The easier task of modelling, typically with a limited range of knives and wooden shaping tools, but mainly using the fingers, allows the artist to take a more free and flexible approach. Small details that might be impractical to carve in stone, of hair or costume for example, can easily be accomplished in terracotta, and drapery can sometimes be made up of thin sheets of clay that make it much easier to achieve a realistic effect.

Reusable mold-making techniques may be used for production of many identical pieces. Compared to marble sculpture and other stonework, the finished product is far lighter and may be further painted and glazed to produce objects with color or durable simulations of metal patina. Robust durable works for outdoor use require greater thickness and so will be heavier, with more care needed in the drying of the unfinished piece to prevent cracking as the material shrinks. Structural considerations are similar to those required for stone sculpture; there is a limit on the stress that can be imposed on terracotta, and terracotta statues of unsupported standing figures are limited to well under life-size unless extra structural support is added. This is also because large figures are extremely difficult to fire, and surviving examples often show sagging or cracks. The Yixian figures were fired in several pieces, and have iron rods inside to hold the structure together.

== Gallery ==
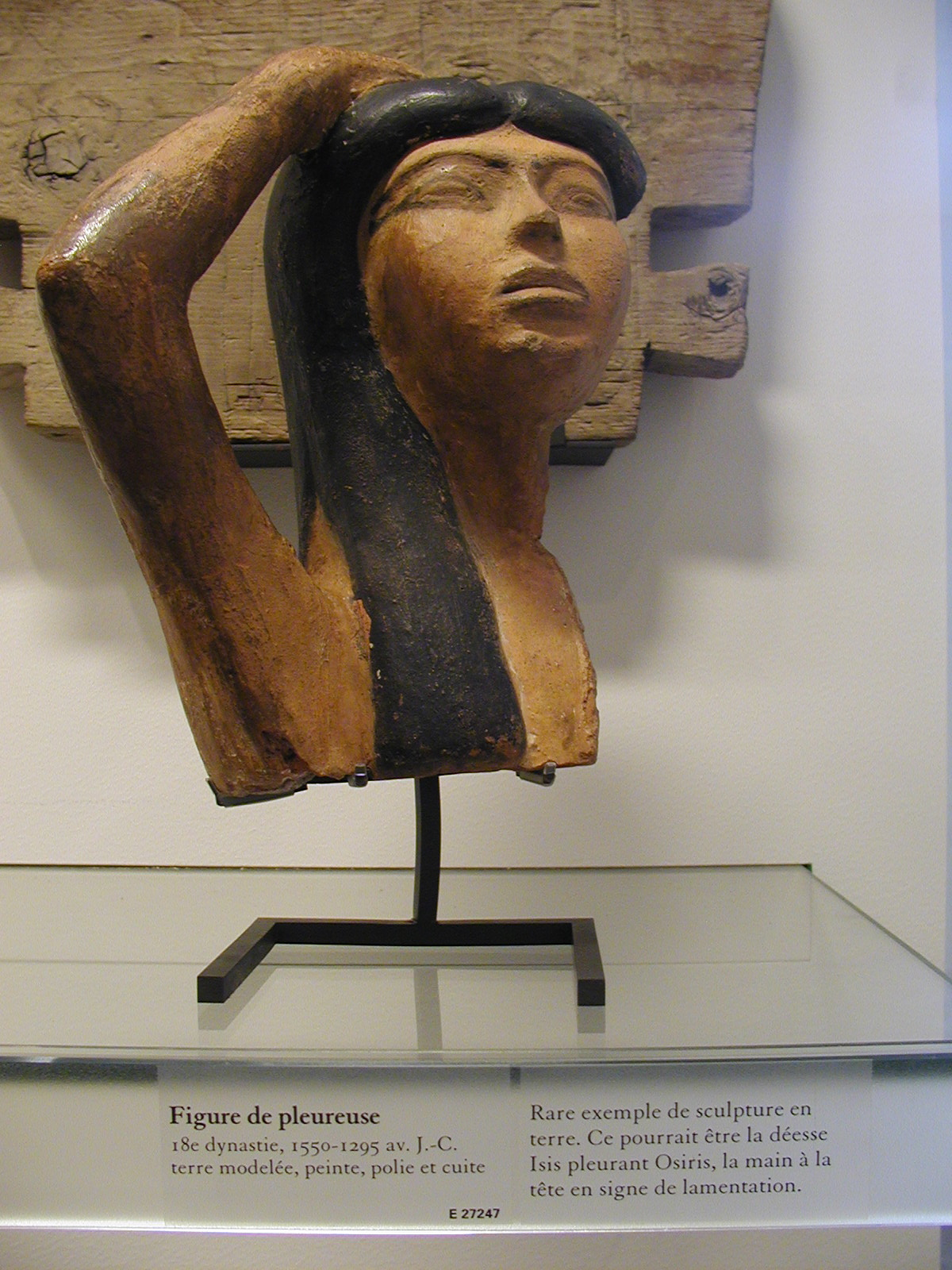
Terracotta image of Isis lamenting the loss of Osiris (Eighteenth Dynasty, Egypt) Musée du Louvre, Paris

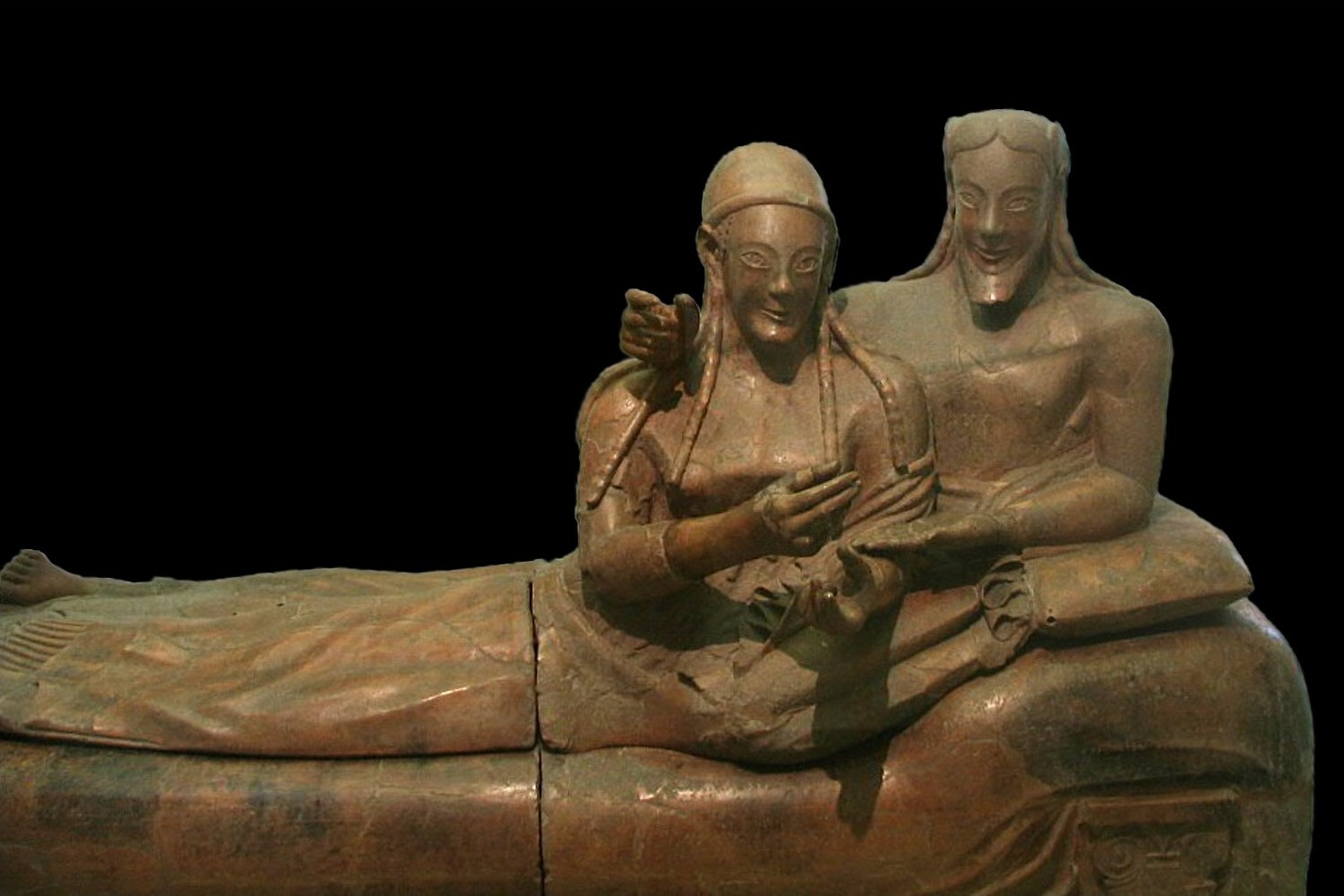
Etruscan "Sarcophagus of the Spouses", at the National Etruscan Museum, c 520 BCE

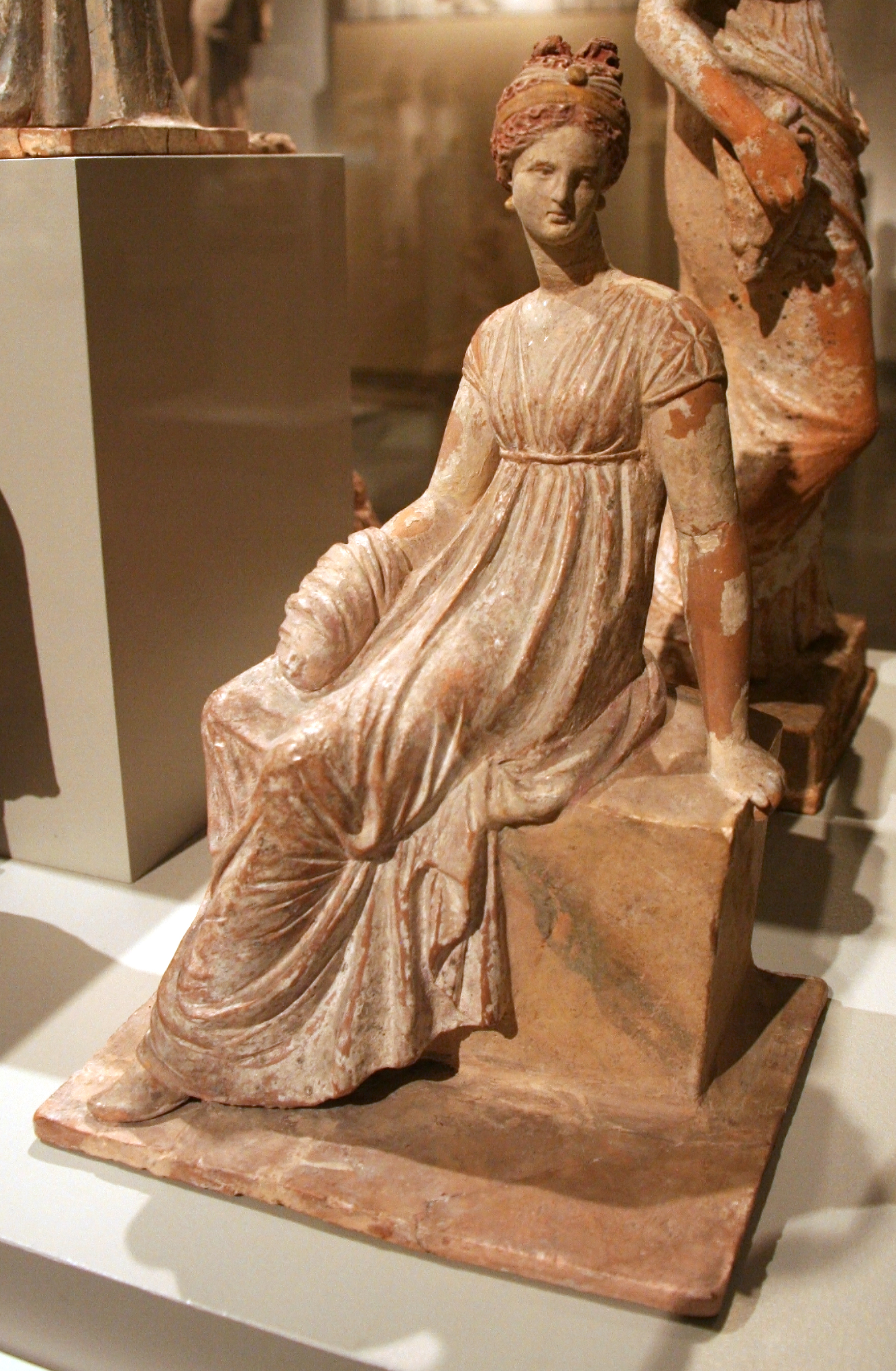
Tanagra figurine, ancient Greece, 325–150 BCE, Altes Museum

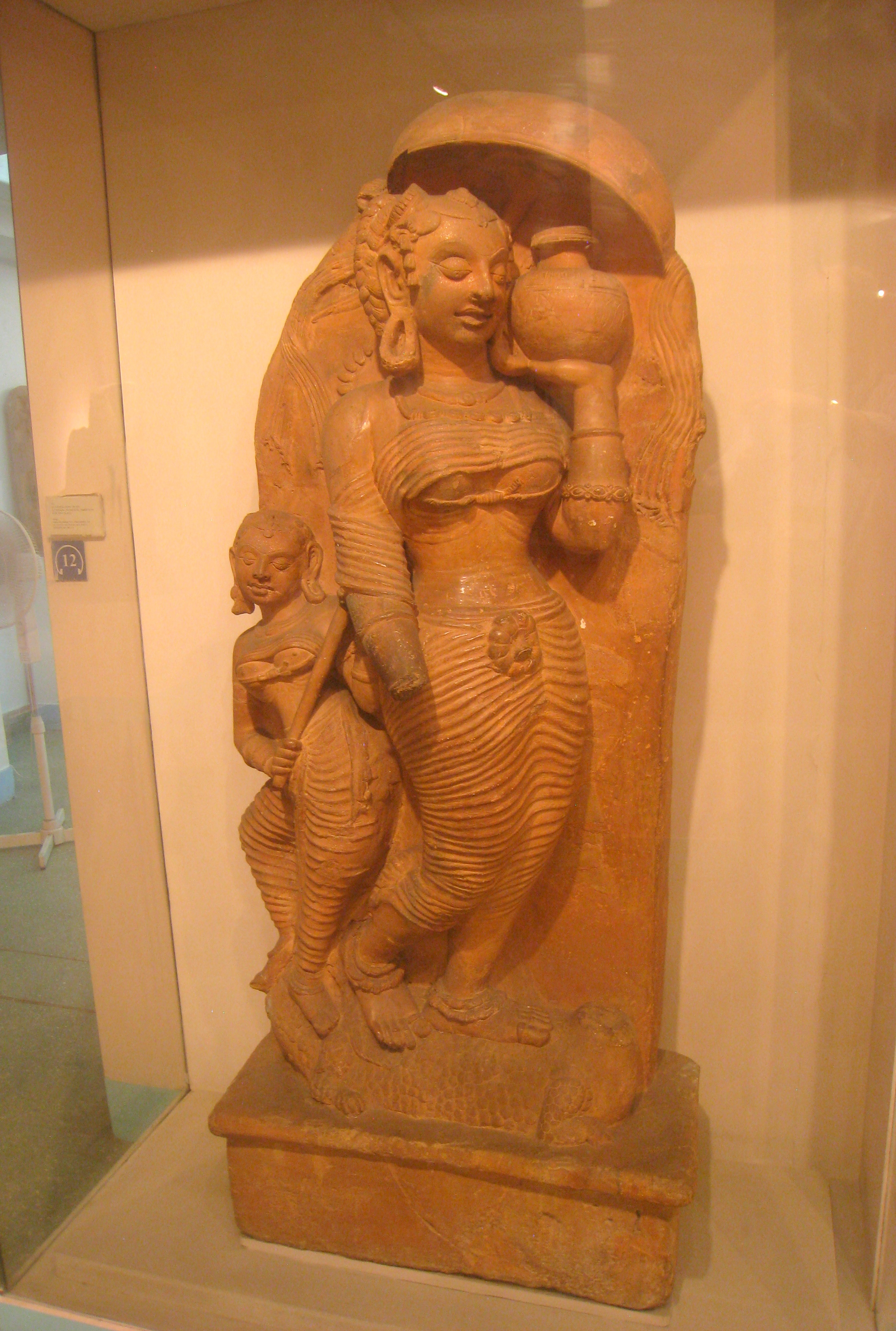
Indian terracotta figure, Gupta dynasty, at the National Museum, New Delhi

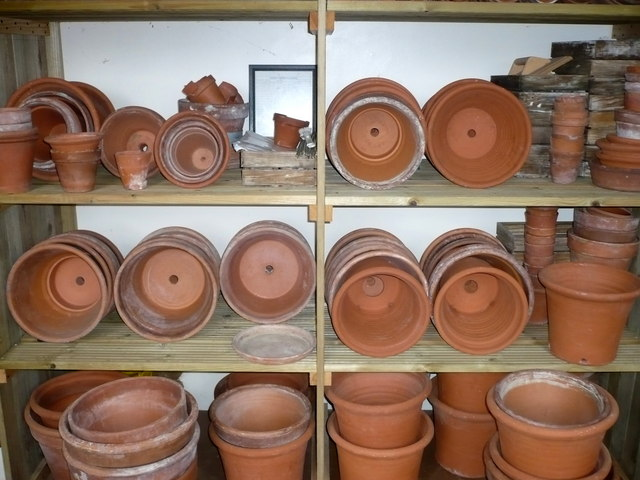
Terracotta flowerpots in Charles Darwin's laboratory at Down House

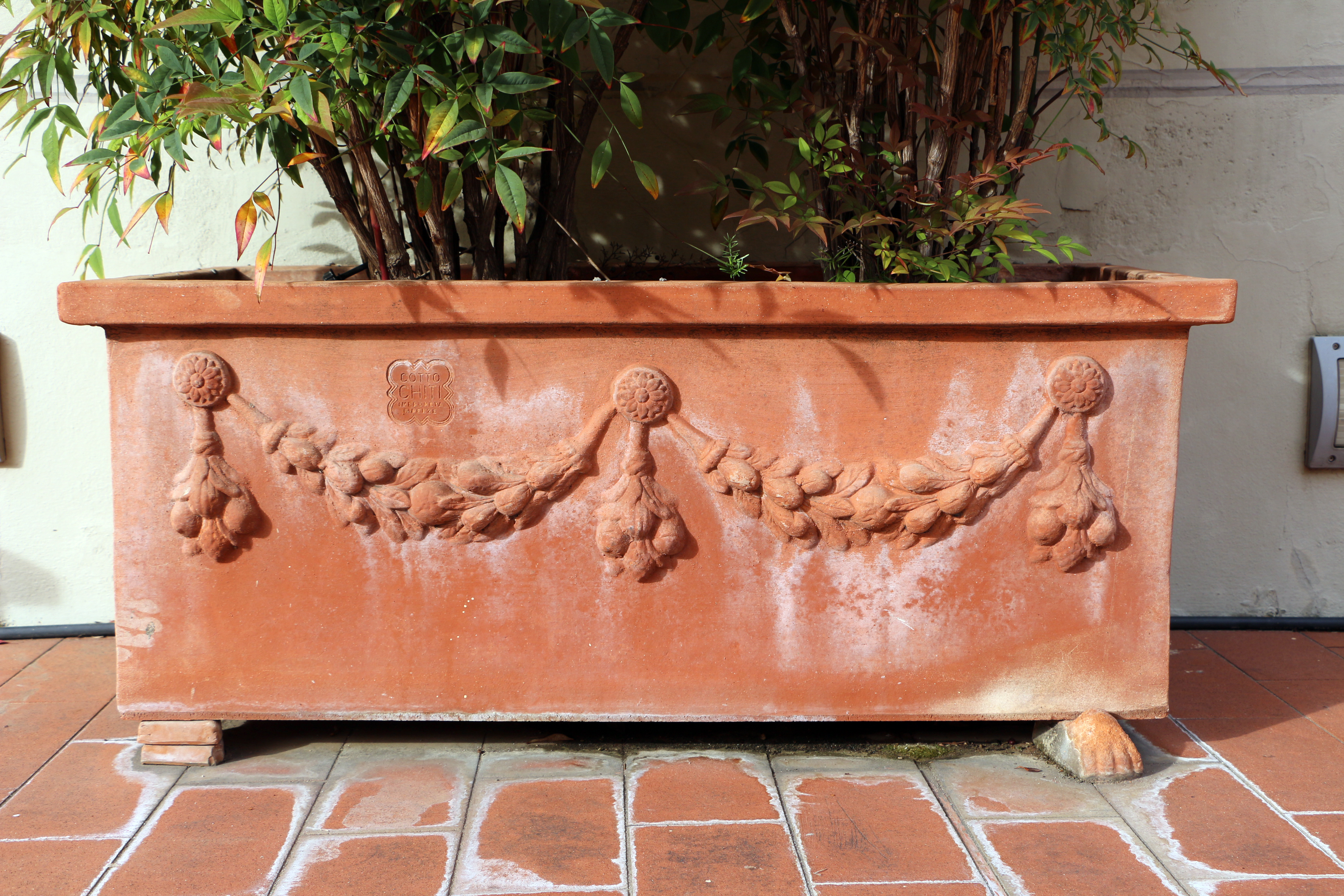
Terraacotta planter in Italy, decorated with festoons

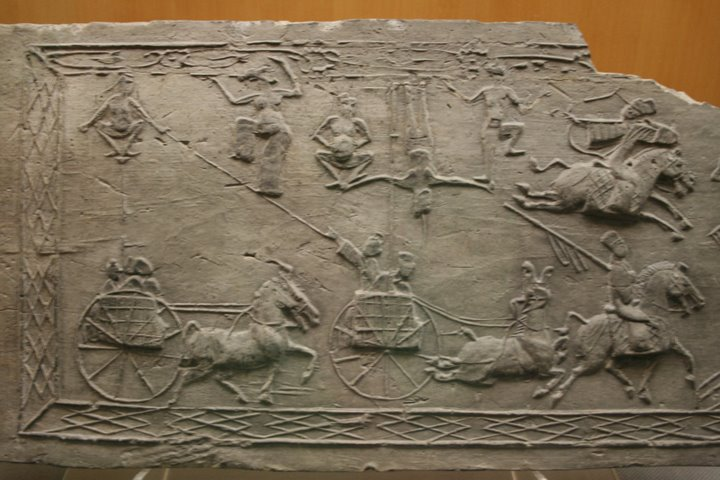
Han dynasty tomb brick relief

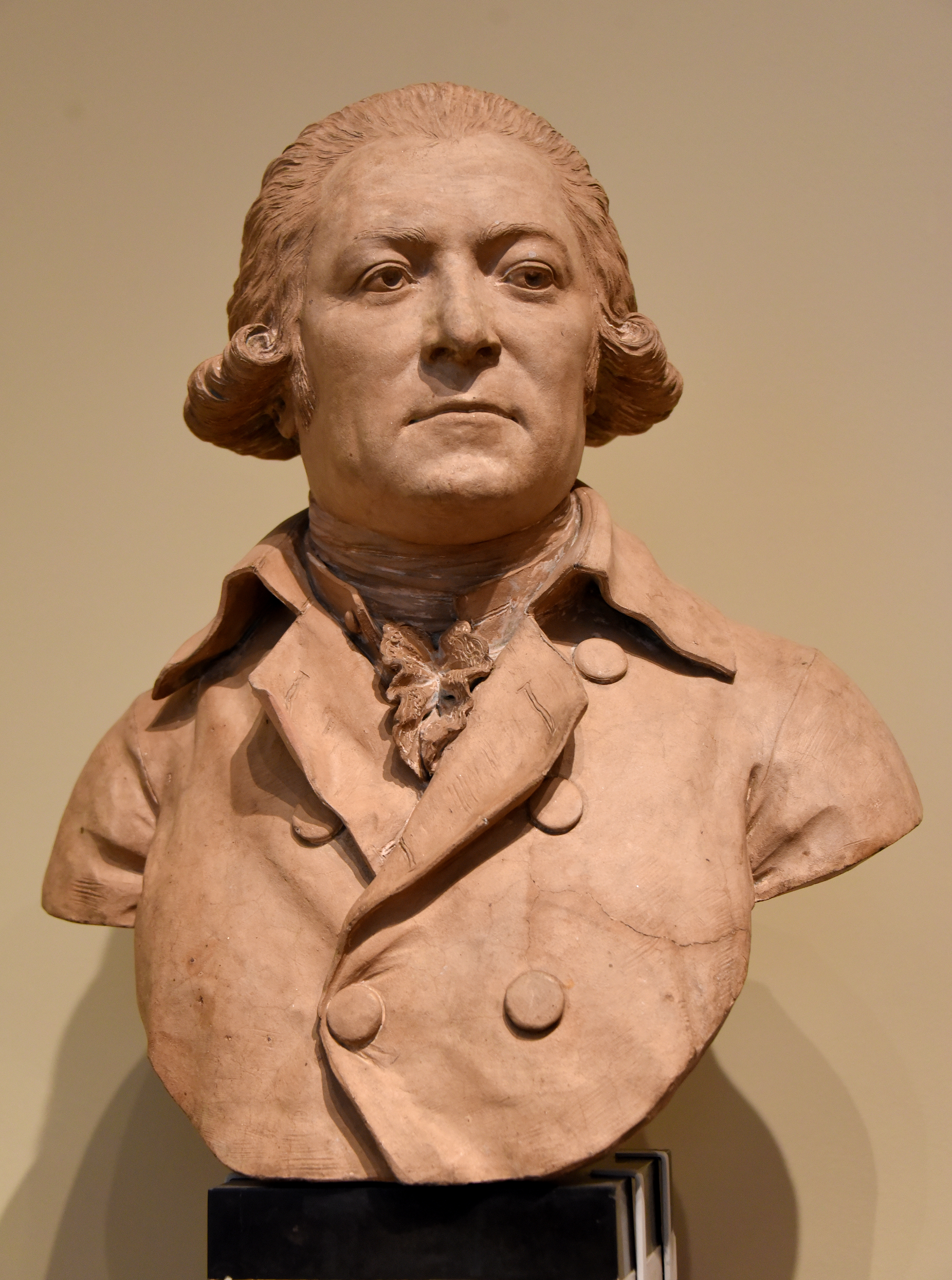
Bust of an unidentified man by Pierre Merard, 1786, France

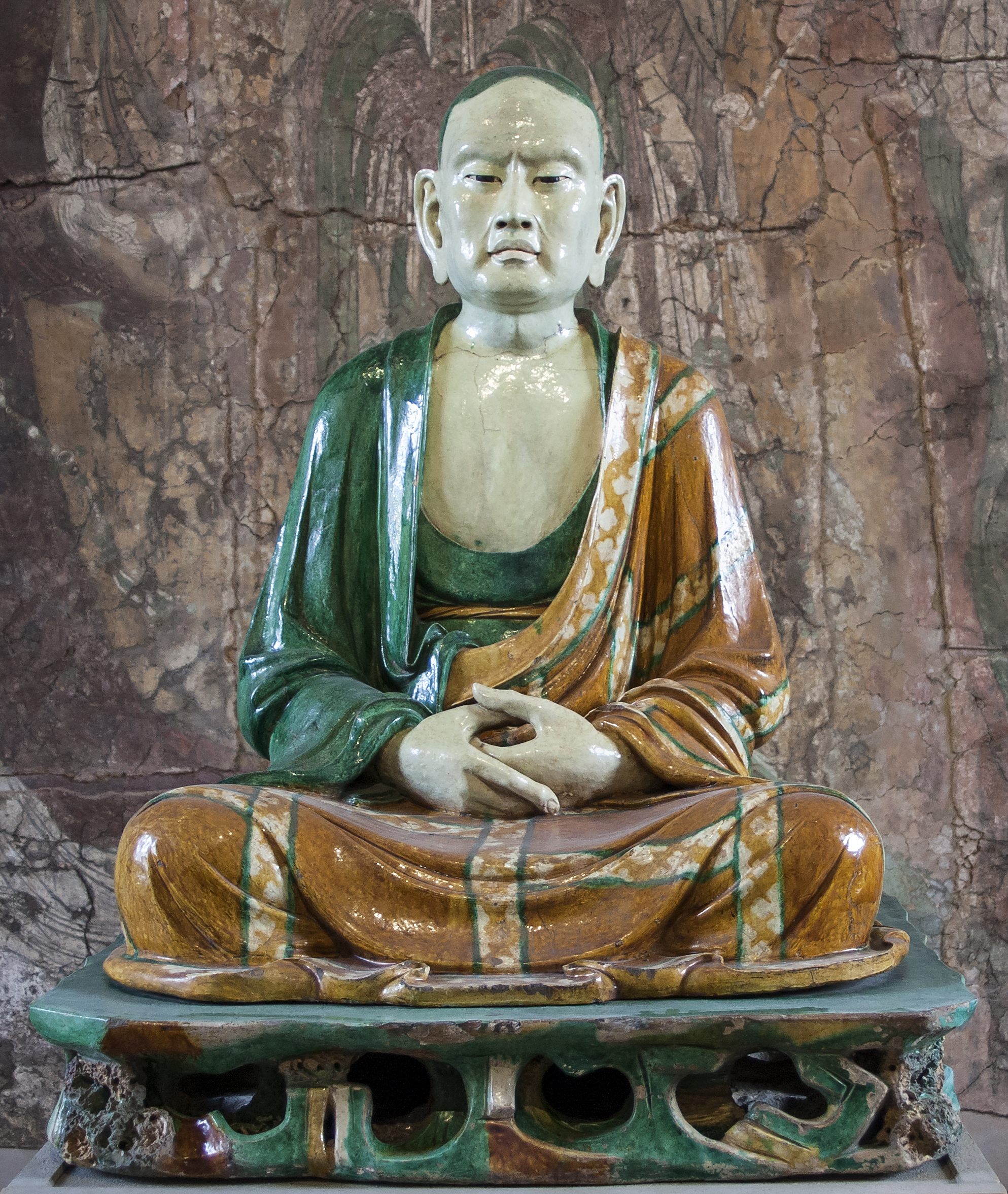
British Museum, Seated Luohan from Yixian, from the Yixian glazed pottery luohans, probably of 1150–1250

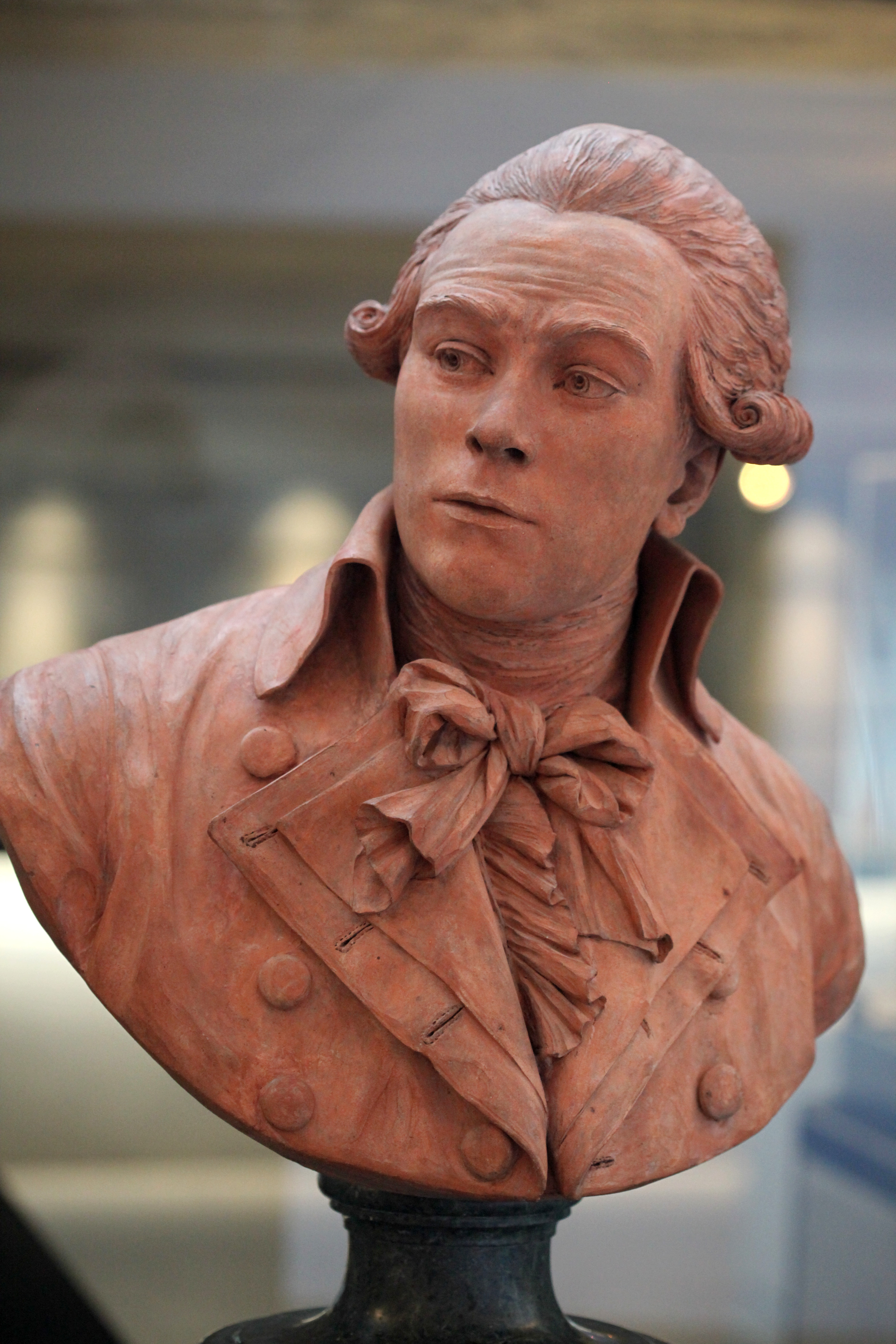
Maximilien Robespierre, unglazed bust by Claude-André Deseine, 1791

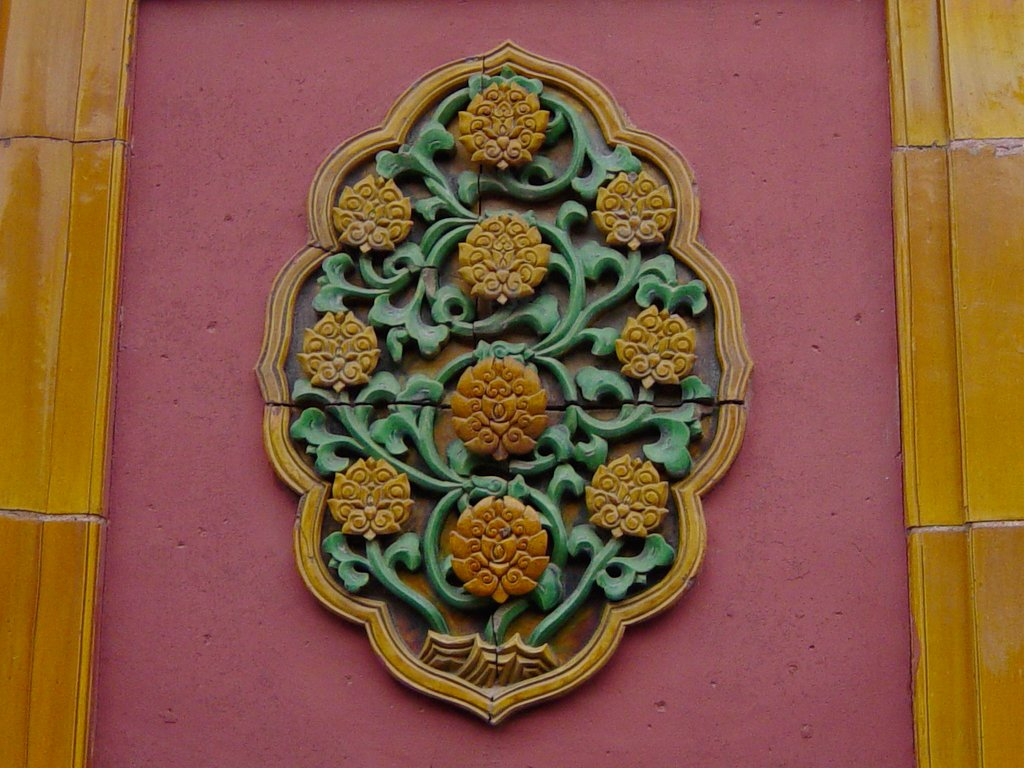
Glazed building decoration at the Forbidden City, Beijing

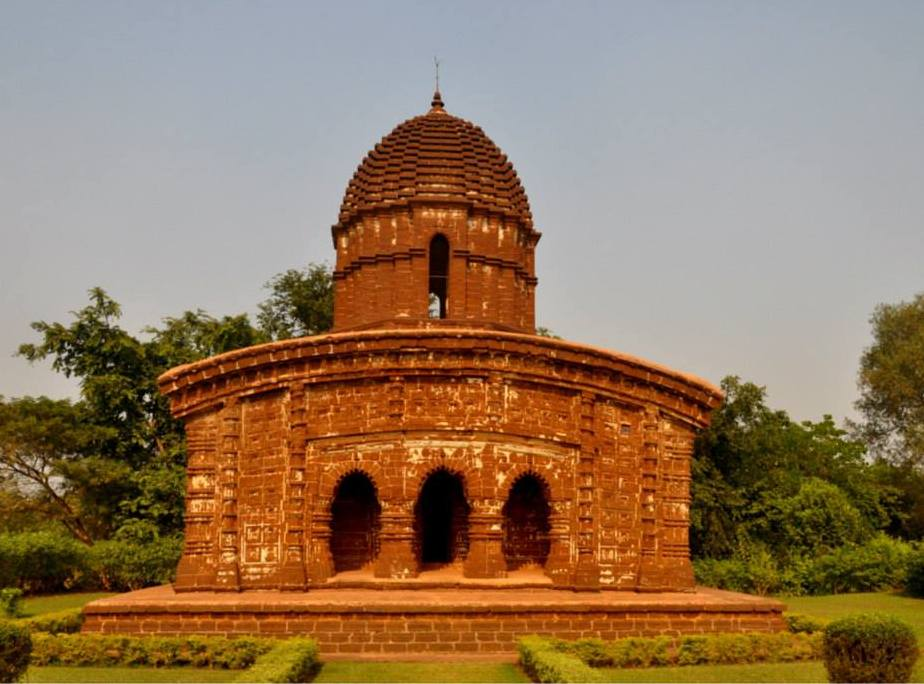
Terracotta temple, Bishnupur, India, a famous centre for terracotta temples

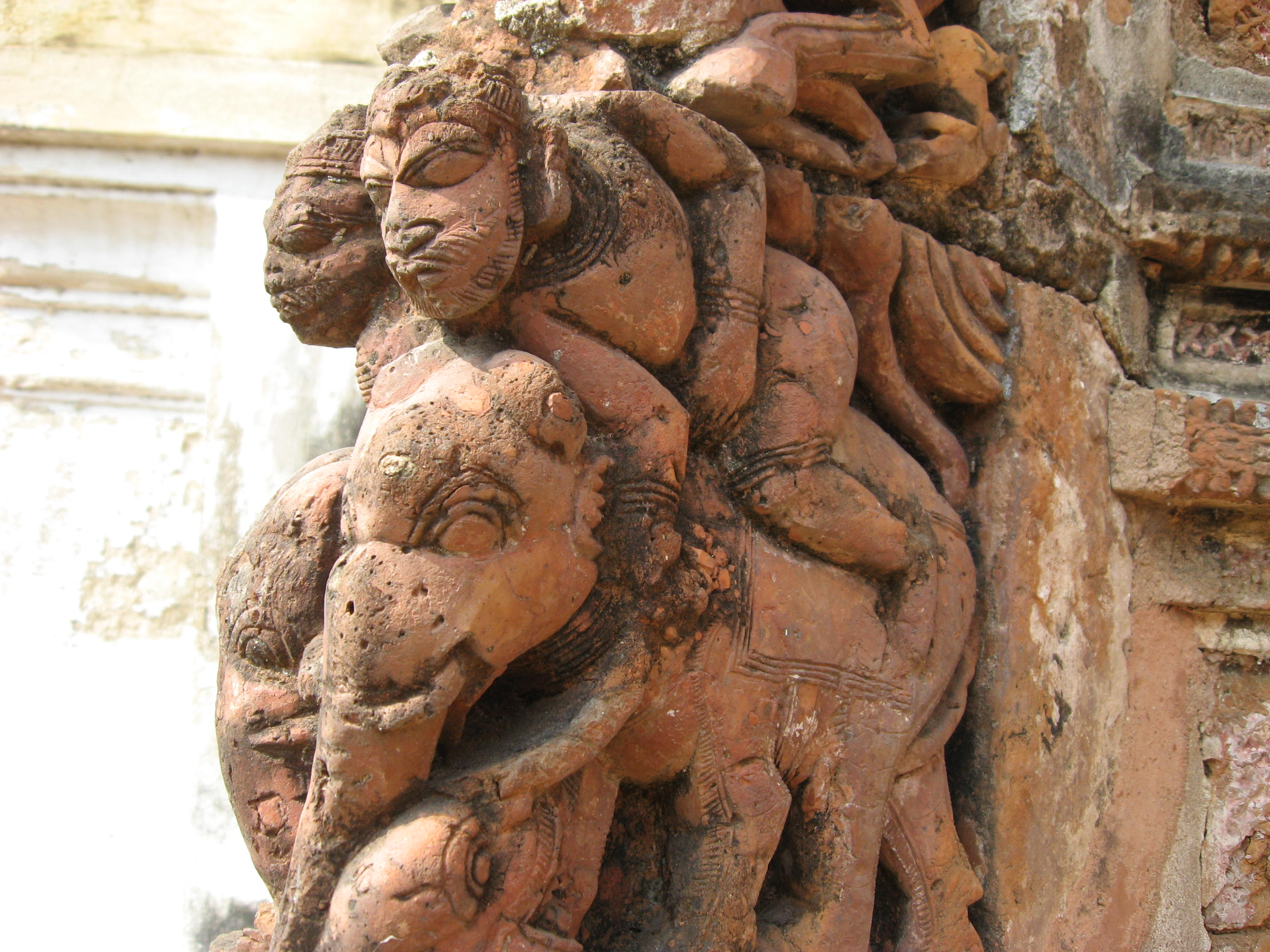
Hindu temple, 1739, Kalna, India

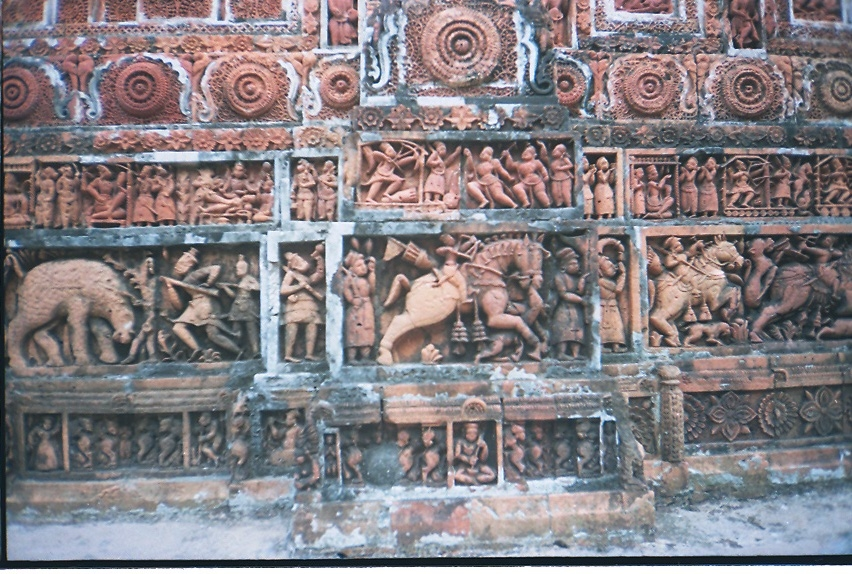
Terracotta designs outside the Kantajew Temple, Dinajpur, Bangladesh

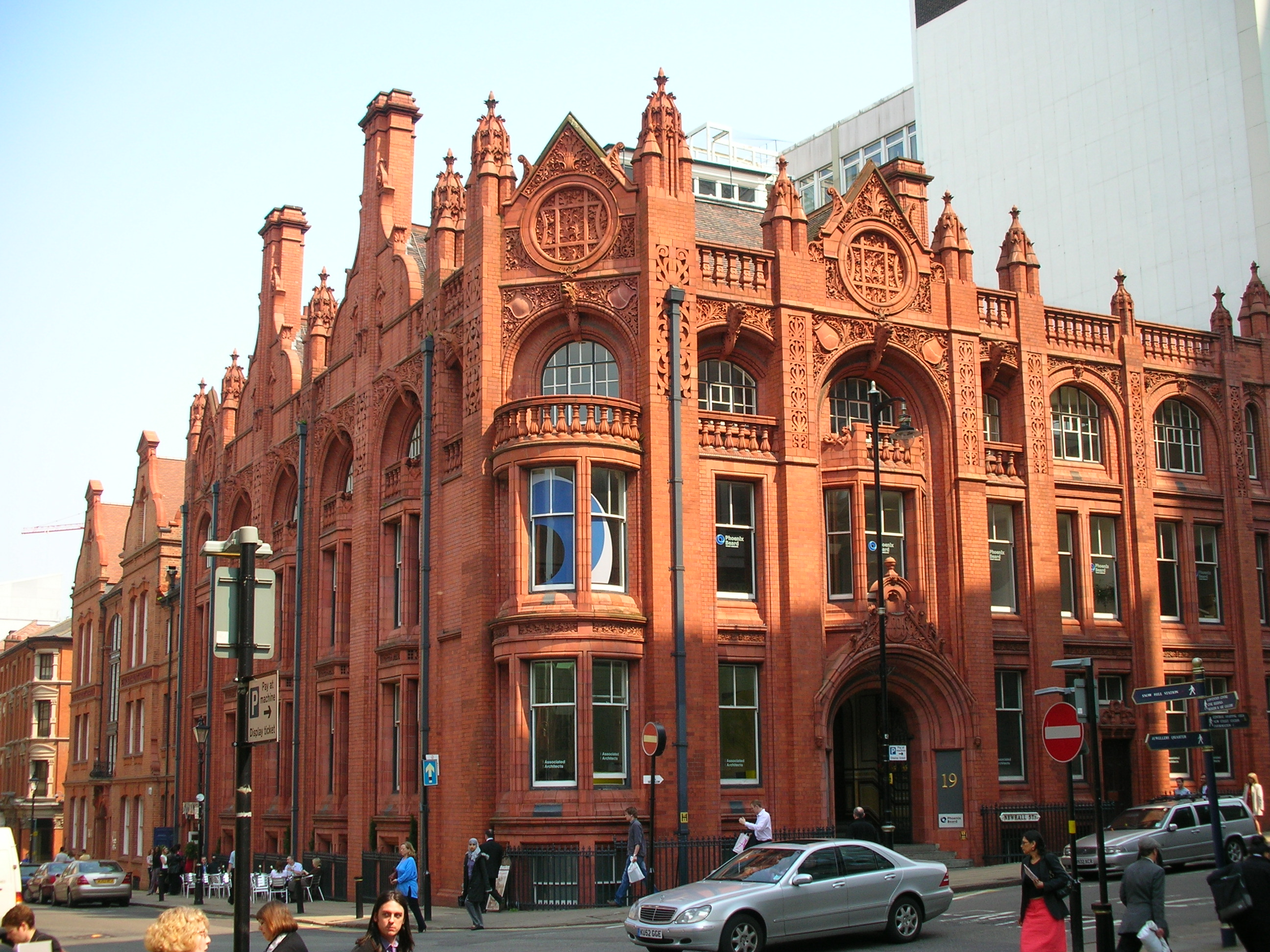
The Bell Edison Telephone Building, Birmingham, England

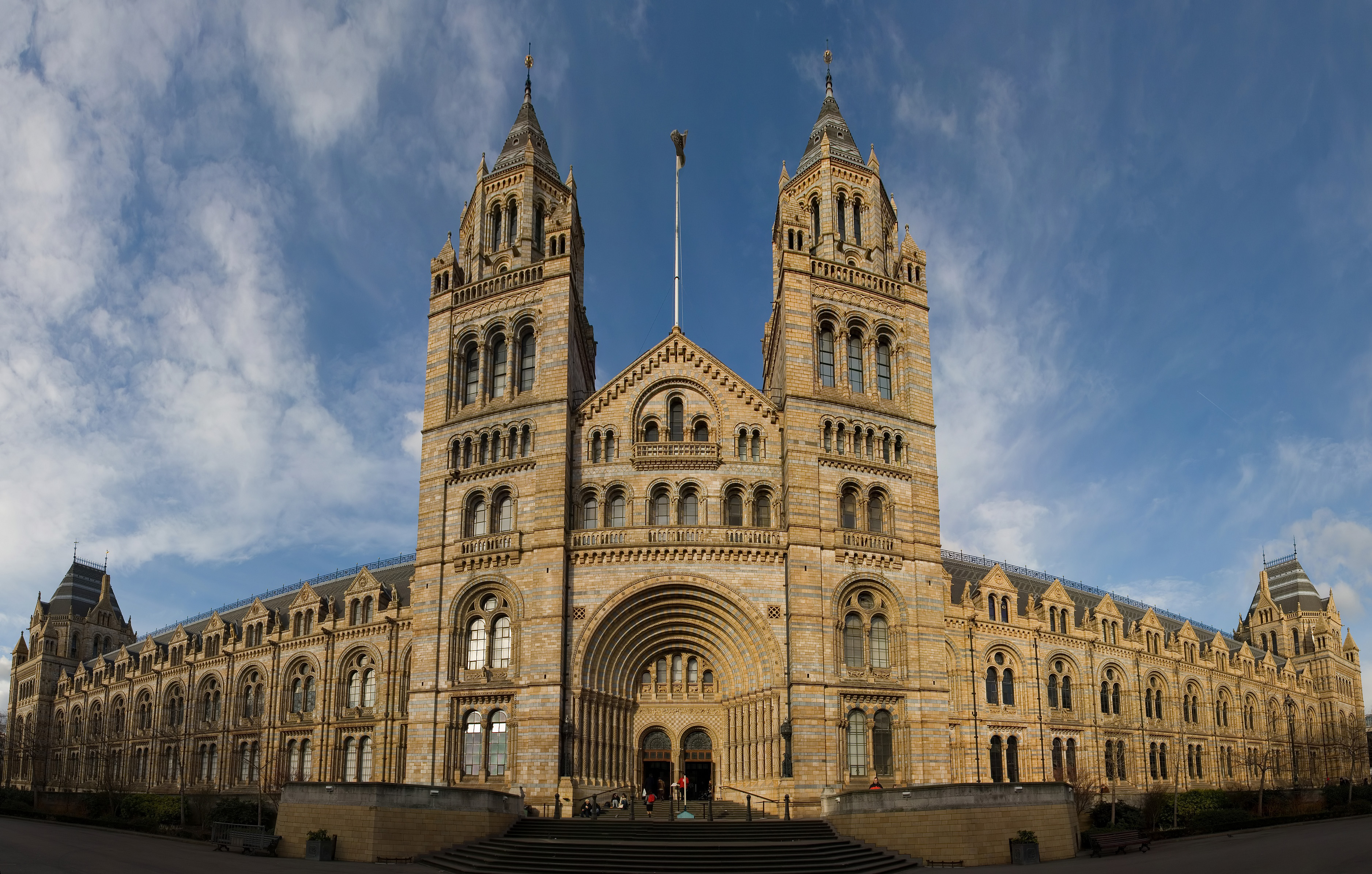
The Natural History Museum in London has an ornate terracotta facade typical of high Victorian architecture. The carvings represent the contents of the Museum.

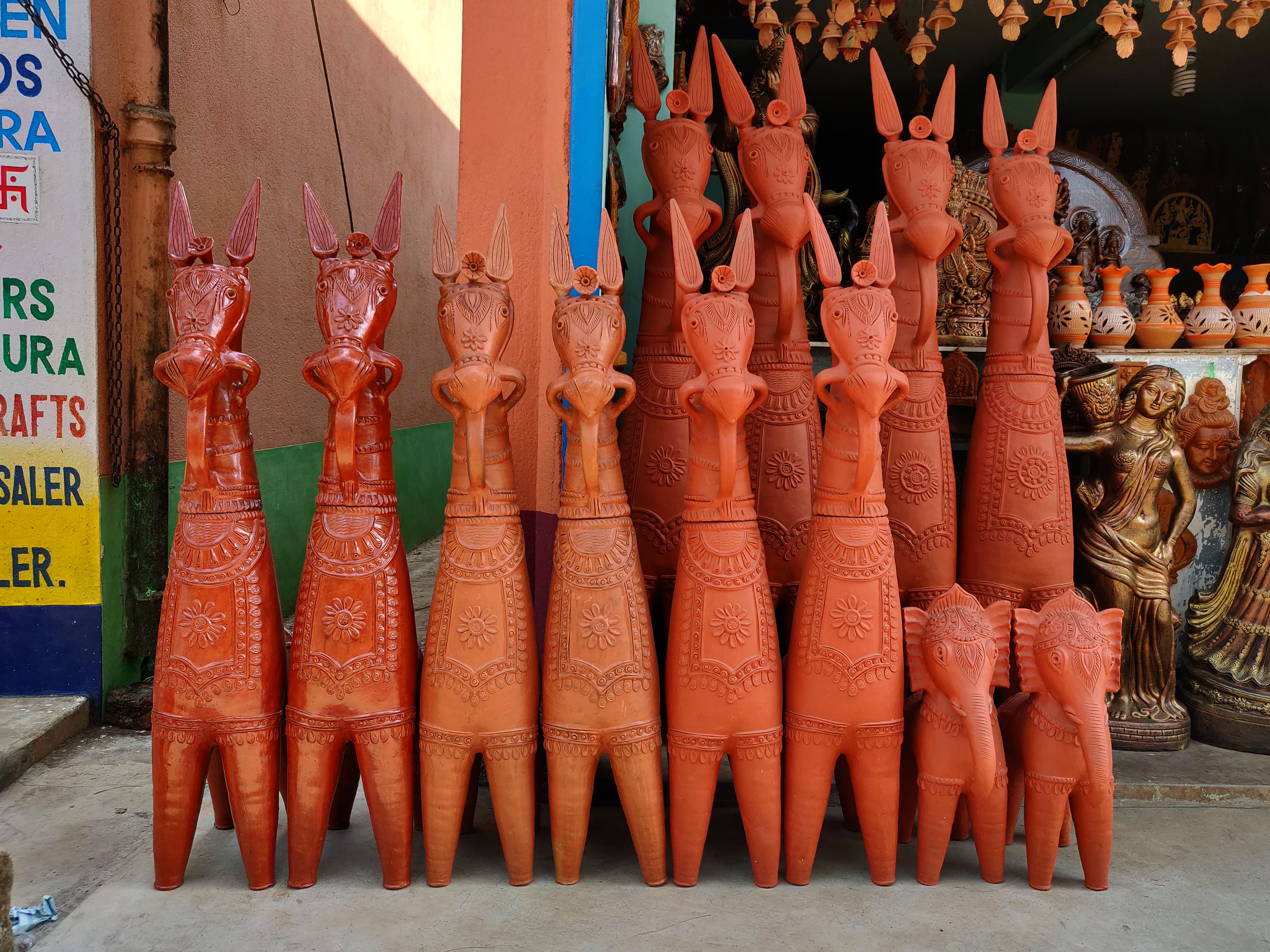
Bankura horses for sale in Bankura, West Bengal, India

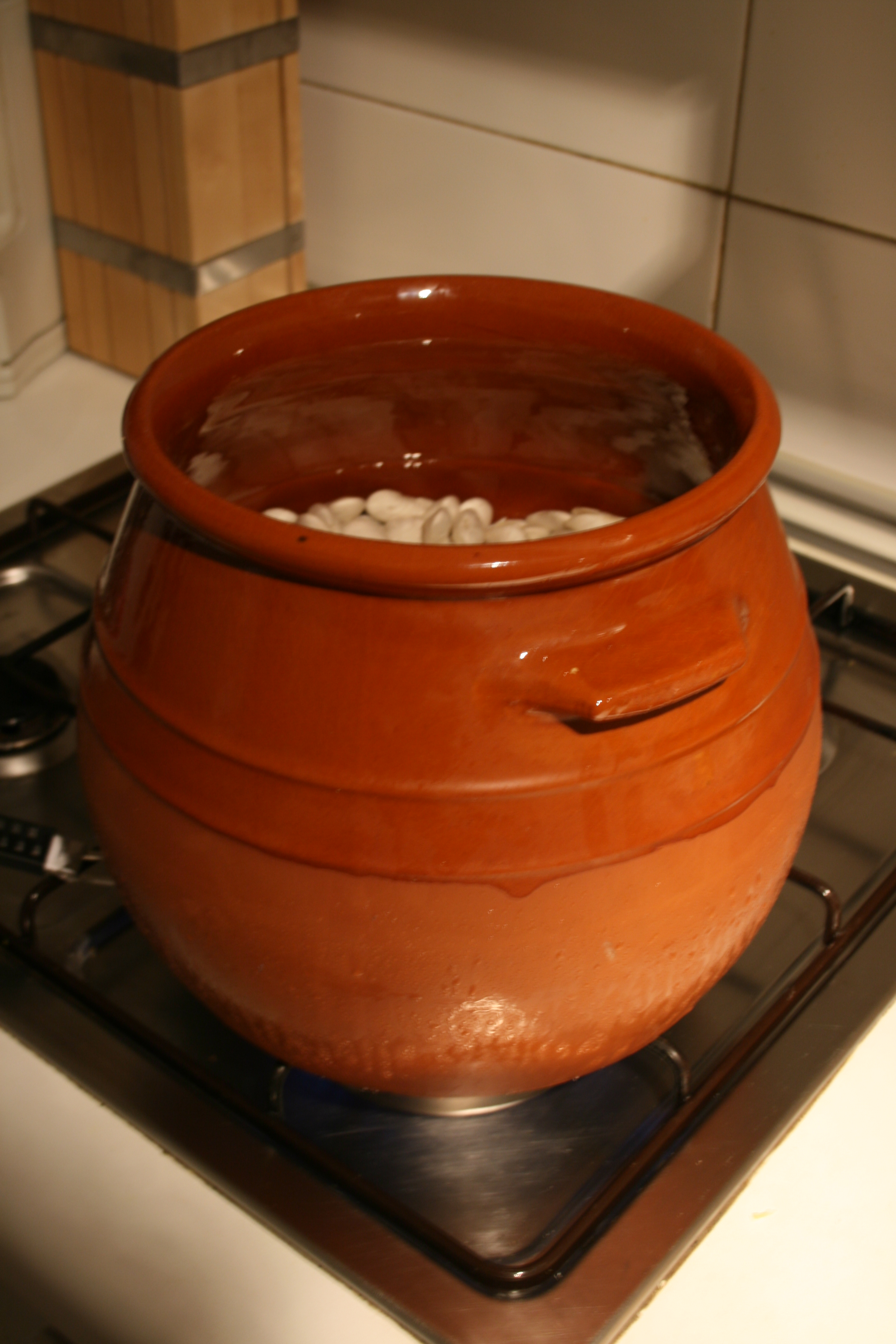
Glazed terracotta casserole bowl

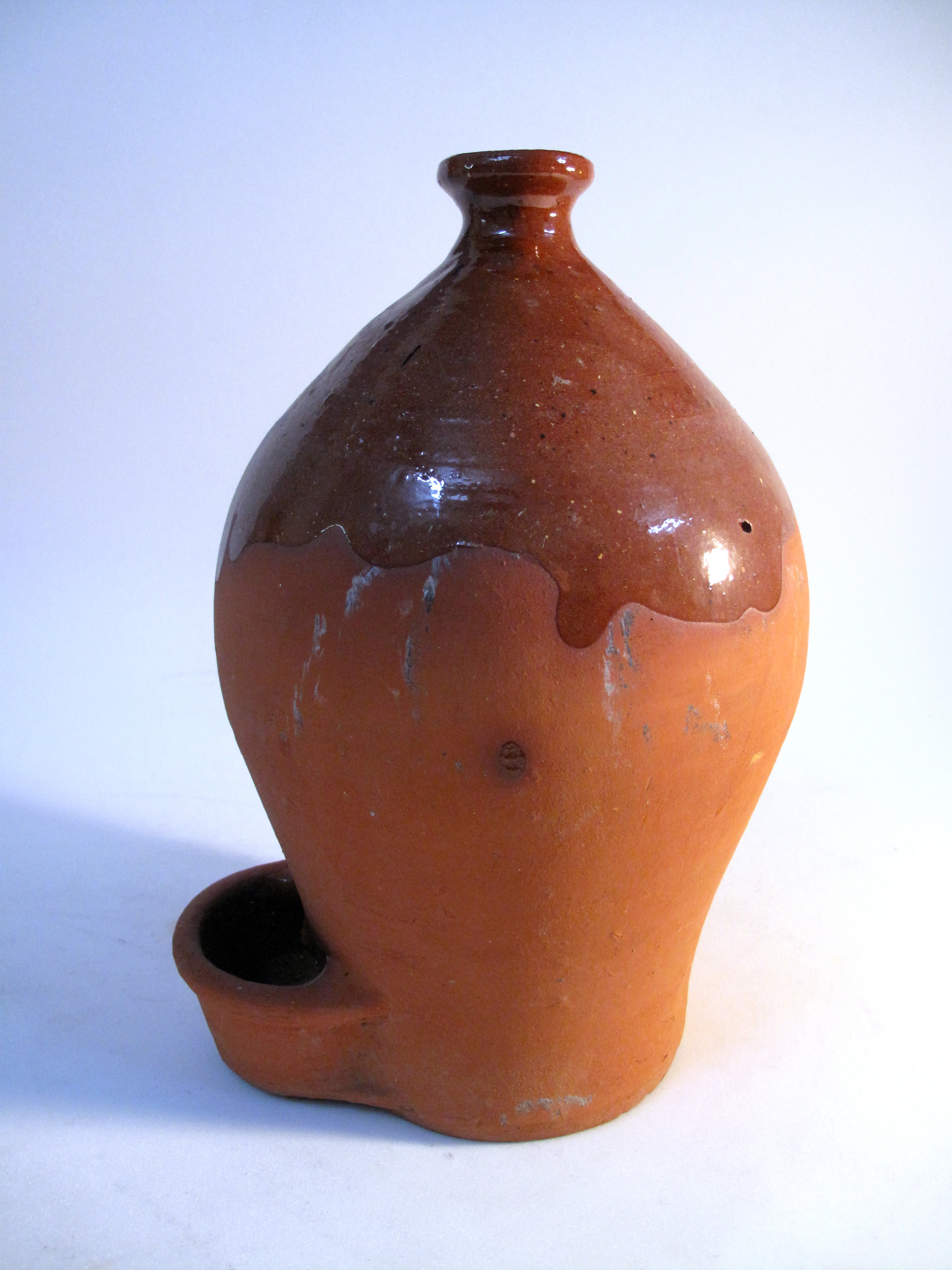
Salt-glazed terracotta jar

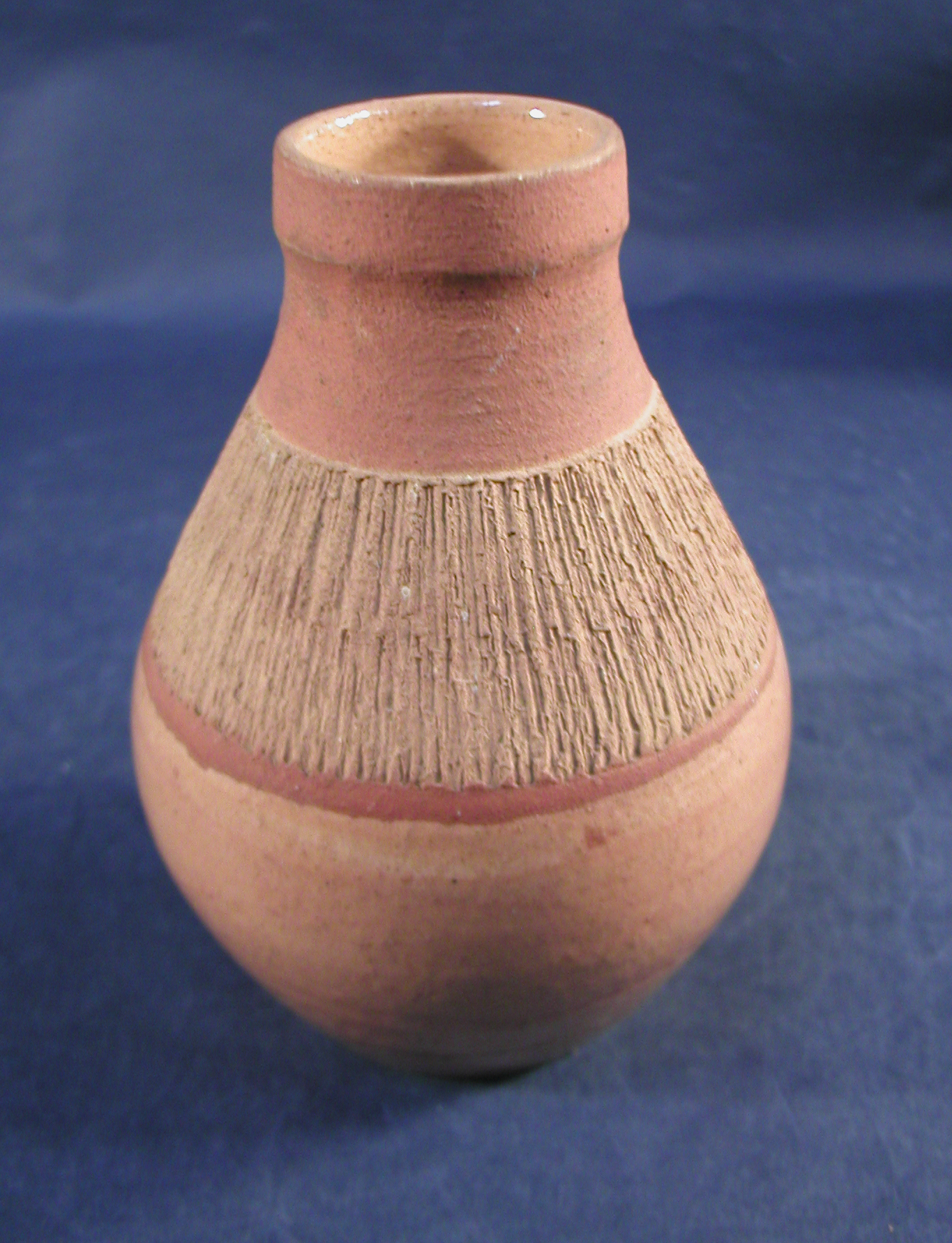
Terracotta vase. Crown Lynn, 1950s

== See also ==
- Architectural terracotta
- Bankura horse
- Bishnupur, Bankura
- Cittacotte
- John Marriott Blashfield, terracotta manufacturer
- Kulhar – traditional terracotta cups
- Majapahit Terracotta
- Panchmura
- Redware
- Saltillo Terracotta Tile
- Structural clay tile
- Tile Heritage Foundation
