= Athena =

Ancient Greek goddess

- Goddess of wisdom, warfare, and handicraft
- Member of the twelve Olympians
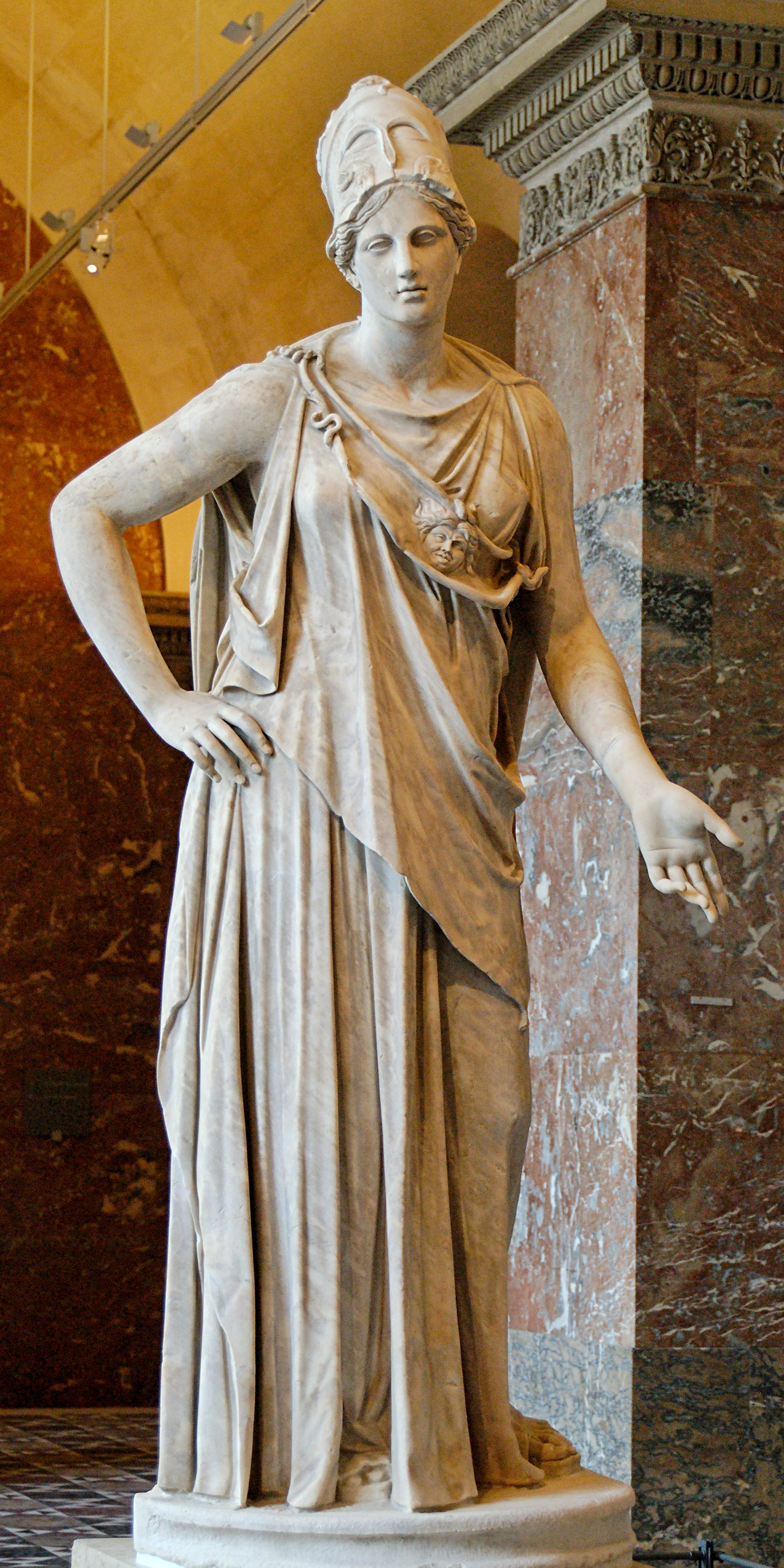
- Mattei Athena at Louvre. Roman copy from the 1st century BC/AD after the Greek original Piraeus Athena of the 4th century BC attributed to Cephisodotos or Euphranor.
- Abode: Mount Olympus
- Animals: Owl, serpent, horse
- Symbol: Aegis, helmet, spear, armour, gorgoneion, chariot, distaff
- Tree: Olive

Genealogy
- Parents: Zeus alone, or Zeus and Metis (Note: In other traditions, Athena's father is sometimes listed as Pallas, Brontes, or Itonos. Poseidon is also sometimes listed as her father, by the nymph Tritonis. Herodotus 4.180, Pausanias 1.14.6)
- Children: Erichthonius (adopted) (Note: In other traditions, Athena is identified as the mother of the Korybantes, Apollo, and/or Lychnus.)

Equivalents
- Etruscan: Menrva
- Roman: Minerva
- Egyptian: Neith

Athena (Note: /əˈθiːnə/; Attic Greek: Ἀθηνᾶ, Athēnâ, or Ἀθηναία, Athēnaía; Epic: Ἀθηναίη, Athēnaíē; Doric: Ἀθάνα, Athā́nā) or Athene, (Note: /əˈθiːniː/; Ionic: Ἀθήνη, Athḗnē) often given the epithet Pallas, (Note: /ˈpæləs/; Παλλάς Pallás) is an ancient Greek goddess associated with wisdom, warfare, and handicraft who was later syncretised with the Roman goddess Minerva and Etruscan Menrva. Athena was regarded as the patron and protectress of various cities across Greece, particularly the city of Athens, from which she most likely received her name. Her major symbols include owls, olive trees, snakes, and the gorgoneion. In art, she is generally depicted wearing a helmet and holding a spear.

From her origin as an Aegean palace goddess, Athena was closely associated with the city of Athens. She was known as Polias and Poliouchos (both derived from polis, meaning "city-state"), and her temples were usually located atop the fortified acropolis in the central part of the city. The Parthenon on the Athenian Acropolis is dedicated to her, along with numerous other temples and monuments. As the patron of craft and weaving, Athena was known as Ergane, and she was credited with other inventions such as the plough and the chariot. She was also a warrior goddess, and was believed to lead soldiers into battle as Athena Promachos. Her main festival in Athens was the Panathenaia, which was celebrated during the month of Hekatombaion in midsummer and was the most important festival on the Athenian calendar.

In Greek mythology, Athena was born from the forehead of her father Zeus; in Hesiod's Theogony, this occurred after Zeus swallowed his consort Metis while she was pregnant with Athena. In the founding myth of Athens, Athena bested Poseidon in a competition over patronage of the city by creating the first olive tree. She was known by a variety of epithets in different cities, such as Athena Parthenos "Athena the Virgin". In one archaic Attic myth, Hephaestus tried and failed to rape her, resulting in Gaia giving birth to Erichthonius, an important Athenian founding hero whom Athena raised. She was one of the most prominent combatants of the Gigantomachy, where she slew Enceladus. She was the patron goddess of heroic endeavour; she was believed to have aided the heroes Perseus, Heracles, Bellerophon, and Jason. Along with Aphrodite and Hera, Athena was one of the three goddesses whose feud resulted in the Trojan War. She plays an active role in the Iliad, in which she assists the Achaeans and, in the Odyssey, she is the tutelary deity to Odysseus.

Since the Renaissance, Athena has become an international symbol of wisdom, the arts, and classical learning. Western artists and allegorists have often used Athena as a symbol of freedom and democracy.

== Etymology ==
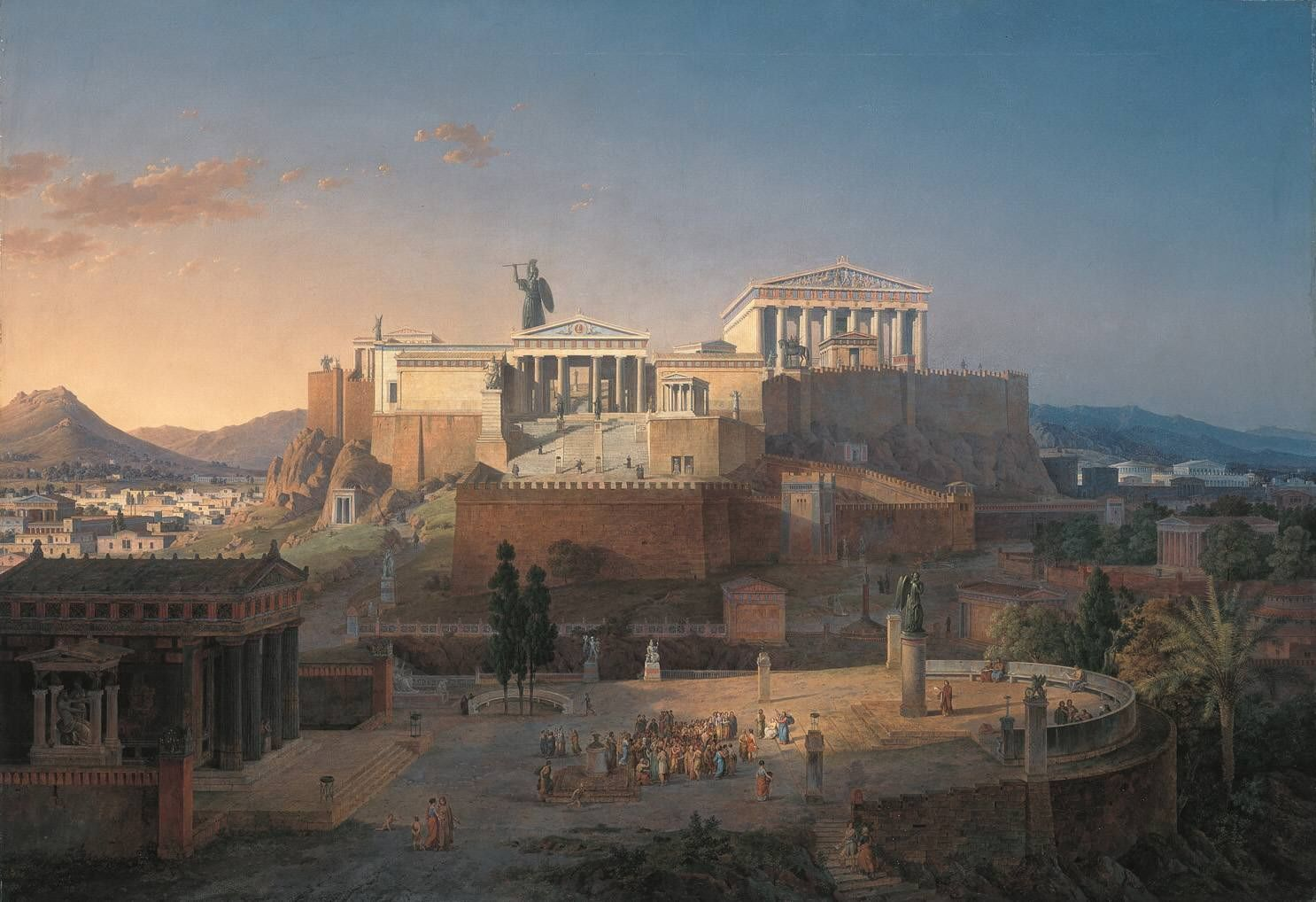
The Acropolis at Athens (1846) by Leo von Klenze.

Athena is associated with the city of Athens. The name of the city in ancient Greek is Ἀθῆναι (Athȇnai), a plural toponym, designating the place where—according to myth—she presided over the Athenai, a sisterhood devoted to her worship. In ancient times, scholars argued whether Athena was named after Athens or Athens after Athena. Now scholars generally agree that the goddess takes her name from the city; the ending -ene is common in names of locations, but rare for personal names. Testimonies from different cities in ancient Greece attest that similar city goddesses were worshipped in other cities and, like Athena, took their names from the cities where they were worshipped. For example, in Mycenae there was a goddess called Mykene, whose sisterhood was known as Mykenai, whereas at Thebes an analogous deity was called Thebe, and the city was known under the plural form Thebai (or Thebes, in English, where the 's' is the plural formation). The name Athenai is likely of pre-Greek origin because it contains the presumably pre-Greek morpheme *-ān-.

In his dialogue Cratylus, the ancient Greek philosopher Plato (428–347 BC) gives some rather imaginative etymologies of Athena's name, based on the theories of the ancient Athenians and his etymological speculations:

That is a graver matter, and there, my friend, the modern interpreters of Homer may, I think, assist in explaining the view of the ancients. Most of these in their explanations of the poet, assert that he meant by Athena "mind" [νοῦς, noũs] and "intelligence" [διάνοια, diánoia], and the maker of names appears to have had a singular notion about her; and indeed calls her by a still higher title, "divine intelligence" [θεοῦ νόησις, theoũ nóēsis], as though he would say: This is she who has the mind of God [ἁ θεονόα, a theonóa]. Perhaps, however, the name Theonoe may mean "she who knows divine things" [τὰ θεῖα νοοῦσα, ta theia noousa] better than others. Nor shall we be far wrong in supposing that the author of it wished to identify this Goddess with moral intelligence [εν έθει νόεσιν, en éthei nóesin], and therefore gave her the name Etheonoe; which, however, either he or his successors have altered into what they thought a nicer form, and called her Athena.

— Plato, Cratylus 407b

Thus, Plato believed that Athena's name was derived from Greek Ἀθεονόα, Atheonóa—which the later Greeks rationalised as from the deity's (θεός, theós) mind (νοῦς, noũs). The second-century AD orator Aelius Aristides attempted to derive natural symbols from the etymological roots of Athena's names to be aether, air, earth, and moon.

== Origins ==
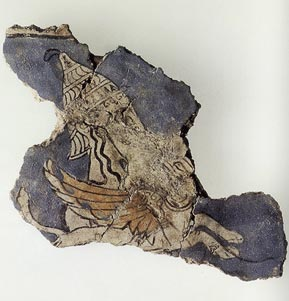
Fragment of a fresco from the Cult Center at Mycenae dating the late thirteenth century BC depicting a warrior goddess, possibly Athena, wearing a boar's tusk helmet and clutching a griffin.

Athena was originally the Aegean goddess of the palace, who presided over household crafts and protected the king. A single Mycenaean Greek inscription 𐀀𐀲𐀙𐀡𐀴𐀛𐀊 a-ta-na po-ti-ni-ja appears at Knossos in the Linear B tablets from the Late Minoan II-era "Room of the Chariot Tablets"; these comprise the earliest Linear B archive anywhere. Although Athana potnia is often translated as "Mistress Athena", it could also mean "the Potnia of Athana", or the Lady of Athens. However, any connection to the city of Athens in the Knossos inscription is uncertain. A sign series a-ta-no-dju-wa-ja appears in the still undeciphered corpus of Linear A tablets, written in the unclassified Minoan language. This could be connected with the Linear B Mycenaean expressions a-ta-na po-ti-ni-ja and di-u-ja or di-wi-ja (Diwia, "of Zeus" or, possibly, related to a homonymous goddess), resulting in a translation "Athena of Zeus" or "divine Athena". Similarly, in the Greek mythology and epic tradition, Athena figures as a daughter of Zeus (Διός θυγάτηρ; cfr. Dyeus). However, the inscription quoted seems to be very similar to "a-ta-nū-tī wa-ya", quoted as SY Za 1 by Jan Best. Best translates the initial a-ta-nū-tī, which is recurrent in line beginnings, as "I have given".

A Mycenean fresco depicts two women extending their hands towards a central figure, who is covered by an enormous figure-eight shield; this may depict the warrior-goddess with her palladium, or her palladium in an aniconic representation. In the "Procession Fresco" at Knossos, which was reconstructed by the Mycenaeans, two rows of figures carrying vessels seem to meet in front of a central figure, which is probably the Minoan precursor to Athena. The early twentieth-century scholar Martin Persson Nilsson argued that the Minoan snake goddess figurines are early representations of Athena.

Nilsson and others have claimed that, in early times, Athena was either an owl herself or a bird goddess in general. In the third book of the Odyssey, she takes the form of a sea-eagle. Proponents of this view argue that she dropped her prophylactic owl mask before she lost her wings. "Athena, by the time she appears in art," Jane Ellen Harrison remarks, "has completely shed her animal form, has reduced the shapes she once wore of snake and bird to attributes, but occasionally in black-figure vase-paintings she still appears with wings."

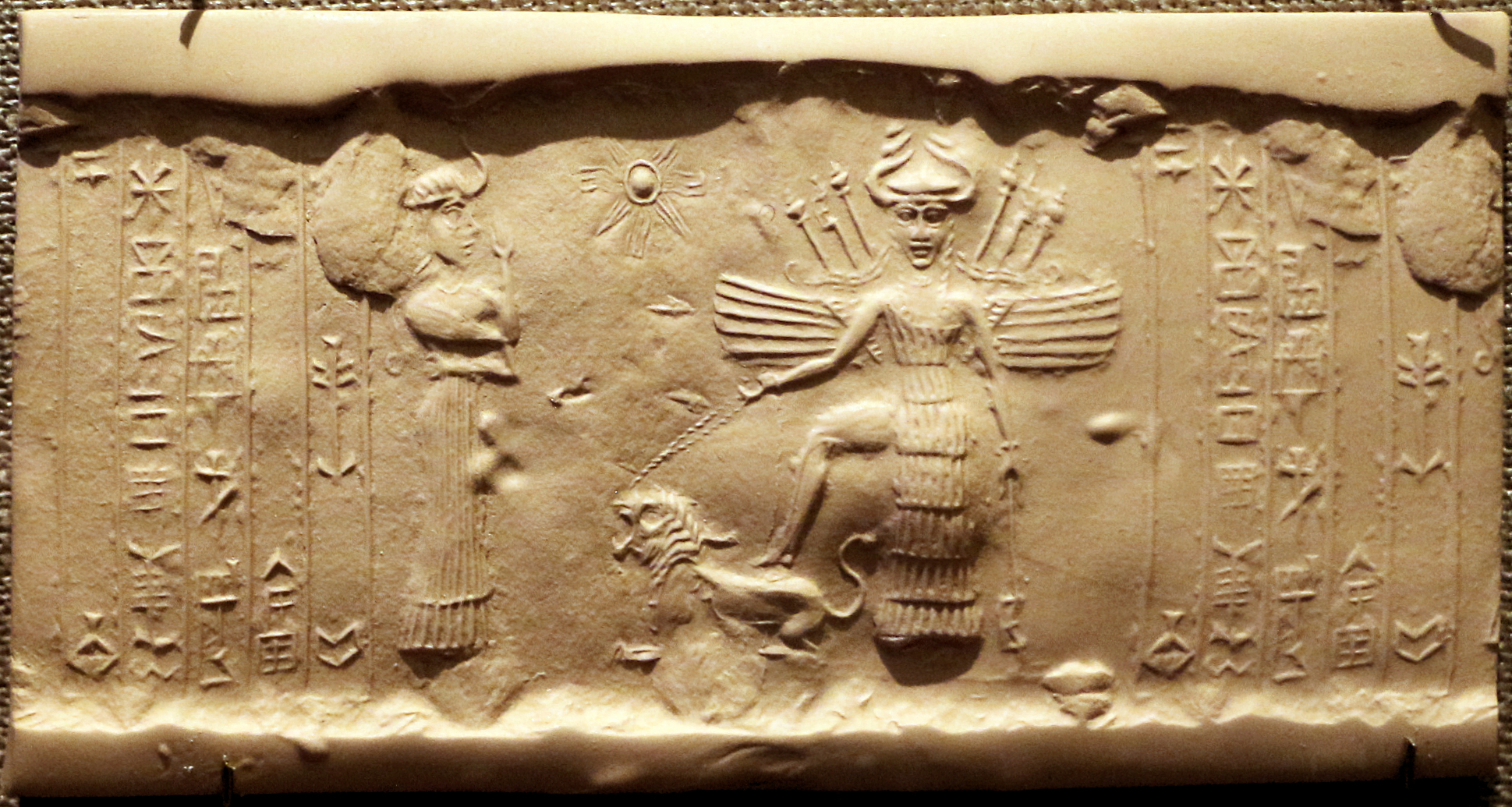
Ancient Akkadian cylinder seal (dating c. 2334–2154 BC) depicting Inanna, the goddess of war, armoured and carrying weapons, resting her foot on the back of a lion

It is generally agreed that the cult of Athena preserves some aspects of the Proto-Indo-European transfunctional goddess. The cult of Athena may have also been influenced by those of Near Eastern warrior goddesses such as the East Semitic Ishtar and the Ugaritic Anat, both of whom were often portrayed bearing arms. Classical scholar Charles Penglase notes that Athena resembles Inanna in her role as a "terrifying warrior goddess" and that both goddesses were closely linked with creation. Athena's birth from the head of Zeus may be derived from the earlier Sumerian myth of Inanna's descent into and return from the underworld.

Plato notes that the citizens of Sais in Egypt worshipped a goddess known as Neith, (Note: "The citizens have a deity for their foundress; she is called in the Egyptian tongue Neith and is asserted by them to be the same whom the Hellenes call Athena; they are great lovers of the Athenians, and say that they are in some way related to them." (Timaeus 21e.)) whom he identifies with Athena. Neith was the ancient Egyptian goddess of war and hunting, who was also associated with weaving; her worship began during the Egyptian Pre-Dynastic period. In Greek mythology, Athena was reported to have visited mythological sites in North Africa, including Libya's Triton River and the Phlegraean plain. (Note: Aeschylus, Eumenides, v. 292 f. Cf. the tradition that she was the daughter of Neilos: see, e. g. Clement of Alexandria Protr. 2.28.2; Cicero, De Natura Deorum 3.59.) Based on these similarities, the Sinologist Martin Bernal created the "Black Athena" hypothesis, which claimed that Neith was brought to Greece from Egypt, along with "an enormous number of features of civilization and culture in the third and second millennia". The "Black Athena" hypothesis stirred up widespread controversy near the end of the twentieth century, but it has now been widely rejected by modern scholars.

== Epithets and attributes ==
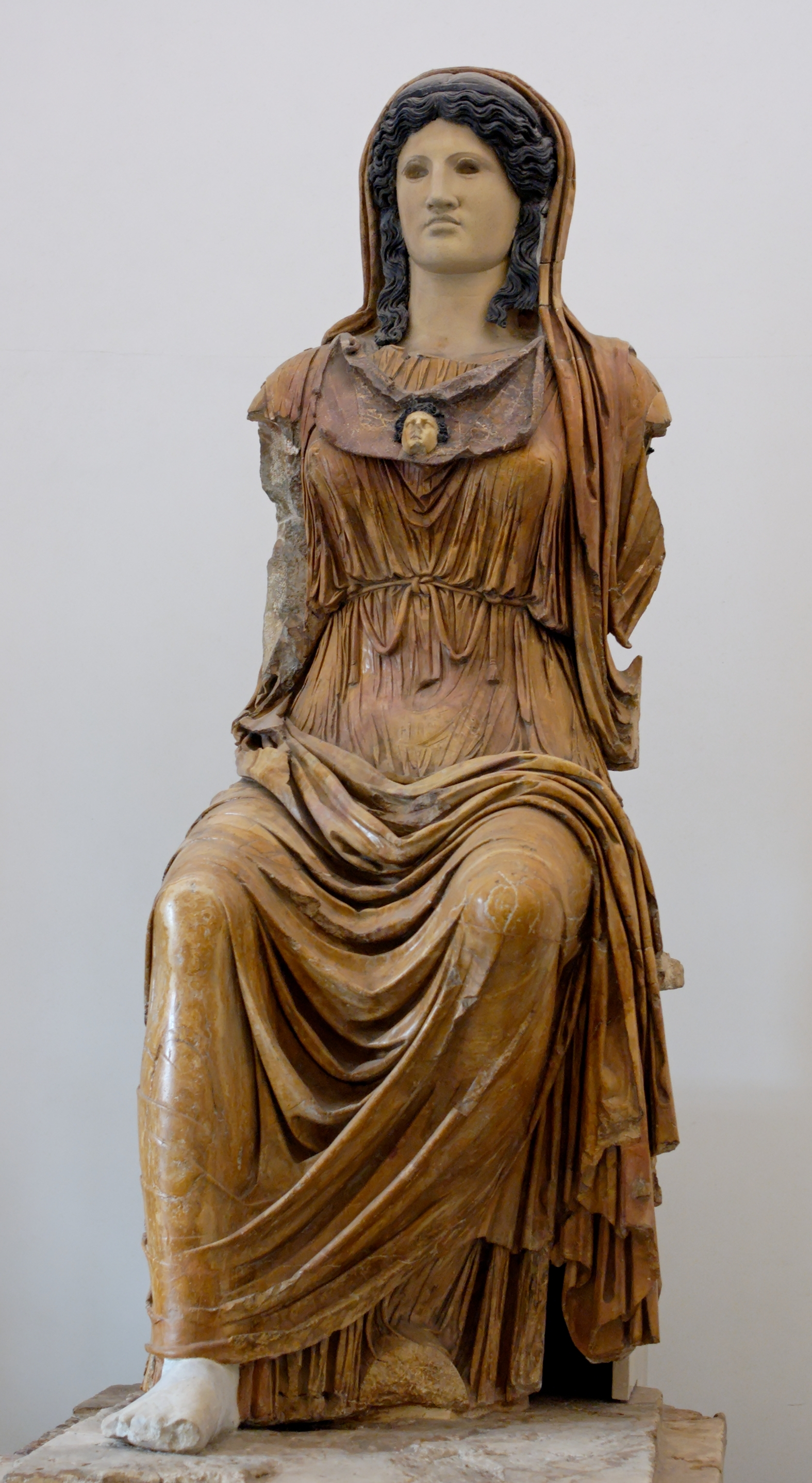
Cult statue of Athena with the face of the Carpegna type (late 1st century BC to early 1st century AD), from the Piazza dell'Emporio, Rome

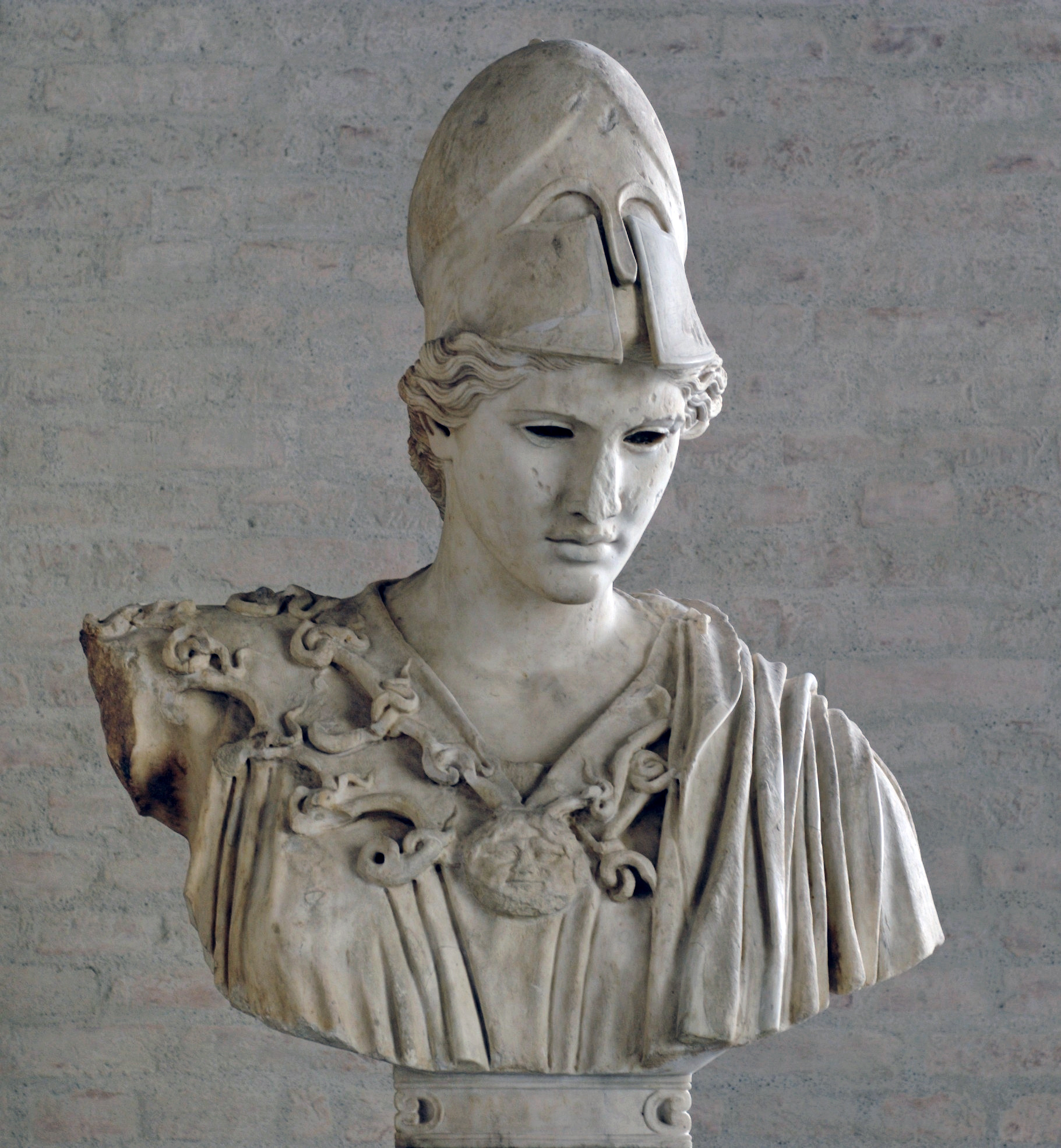
Bust of the Velletri Pallas type, copy after a votive statue of Kresilas in Athens (c. 425 BC)

Athena was also the goddess of peace.

In a similar manner to her patronage of various activities and Greek cities, Athena was thought to be a "protector of heroes" and a "patron of art" and various local traditions related to the arts and handicrafts.

Athena was known as Atrytone (Άτρυτώνη "the Unwearying"), Parthenos (Παρθένος "Virgin"), and Promachos (Πρόμαχος "she who fights in front"). The epithet Polias (Πολιάς "of the city"), refers to Athena's role as protectress of the city. The epithet Ergane (Εργάνη "the Industrious") pointed her out as the patron of craftsmen and artisans. Burkert notes that the Athenians sometimes simply called Athena "the Goddess", hē theós (ἡ θεός), certainly an ancient title. After serving as the judge at the trial of Orestes in which he was acquitted of having murdered his mother Clytemnestra since he was following Apollo's orders, Athena won the epithet Areia (Αρεία).

Athena was sometimes given the epithet Hippia (Ἵππια "of the horses", "equestrian"), referring to her invention of the bit, bridle, chariot, and wagon. The Greek geographer Pausanias mentions in his Guide to Greece that the temple of Athena Chalinitis ("the bridler") in Corinth was located near the tomb of Medea's children. Other epithets include Ageleia, Itonia and Aethyia, under which she was worshiped in Megara. She was worshipped as Assesia in Assesos. The word aíthyia (αἴθυια) signifies a "diver", also some diving bird species (possibly the shearwater) and figuratively, a "ship", so the name must reference Athena teaching the art of shipbuilding or navigation. In a temple at Phrixa in Elis, reportedly built by Clymenus, she was known as Cydonia (Κυδωνία). Pausanias wrote that at Buporthmus there was a sanctuary of Athena Promachorma (Προμαχόρμα), meaning protector of the anchorage.

The Greek biographer Plutarch describes Pericles's dedication of a statue to her as Athena Hygieia (Ὑγίεια, "Health") after she inspired, in a dream, his successful treatment of a man injured during the construction of the gateway to the Acropolis. Mechanitis (Μηχανῖτις), meaning skilled in inventing, was one of the epithets of her.

At Athens there is the temple of Athena Phratria, as patron of a phratry, in the Ancient Agora of Athens.

=== Pallas Athena ===
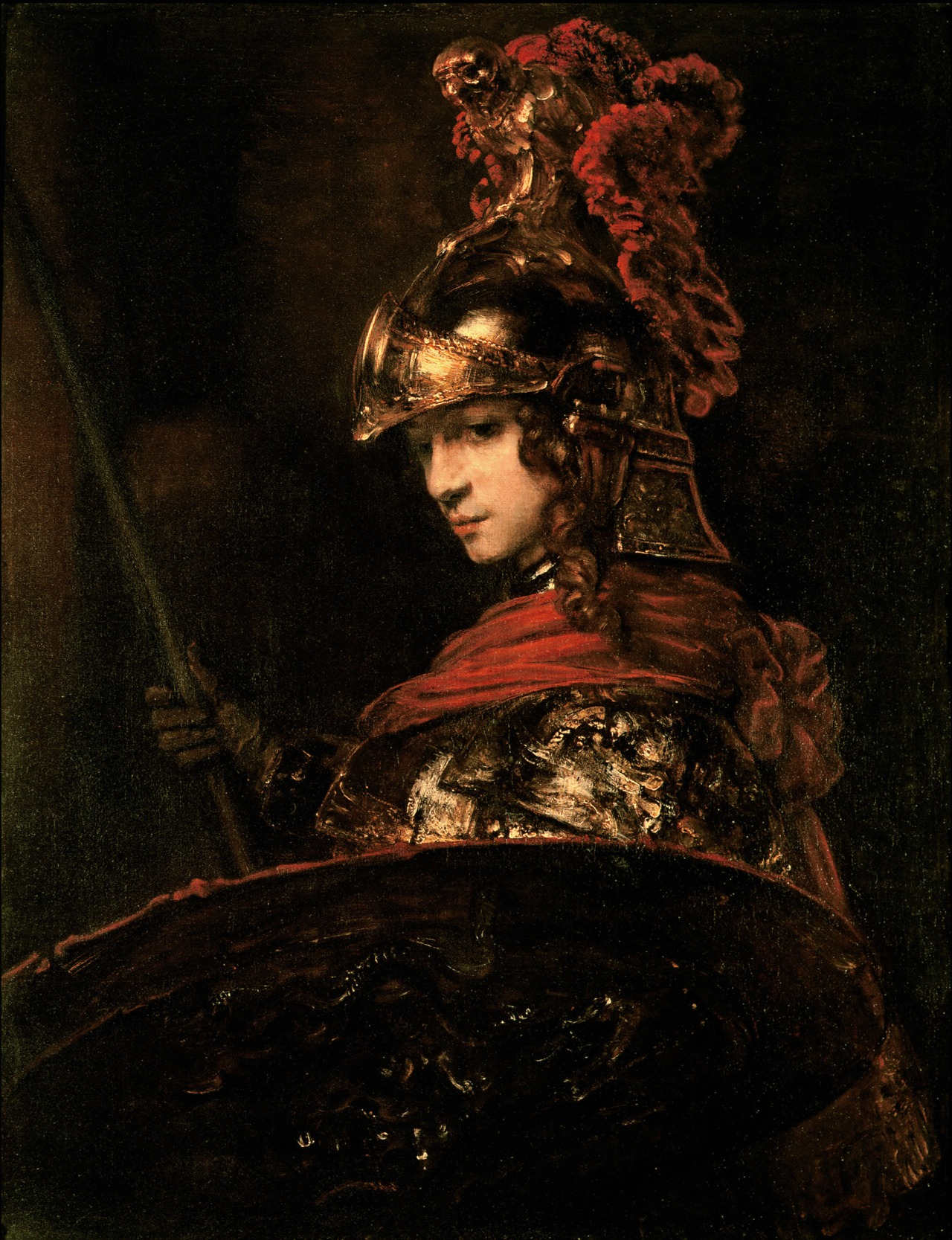
Pallas Athenas (1657) by Rembrandt, which recalls her attributes as the goddess of warfare.

Athena's epithet Pallas – her most renowned one – is derived either from πάλλω, meaning "to brandish [as a weapon]", or, more likely, from παλλακίς and related words, meaning "youth, young woman". On this topic, Walter Burkert says "she is the Pallas of Athens, Pallas Athenaie, just as Hera of Argos is Here Argeie". In later times, after the original meaning of the name had been forgotten, the Greeks invented myths to explain its origins, such as those reported by the Epicurean philosopher Philodemus and the Bibliotheca of Pseudo-Apollodorus, which claim that Pallas was originally a separate entity, whom Athena had slain in combat.

In one version of the myth, Pallas was the daughter of the sea-god Triton, who was childhood friends with Athena. Zeus one day watched Athena and Pallas have a friendly sparring match. Not wanting his daughter to lose, Zeus flapped his aegis to distract Pallas, whom Athena accidentally impaled. Distraught over what she had done, Athena took the name Pallas for herself as a sign of her grief and tribute to her friend and Zeus gave her the aegis as an apology. In another version of the story, Pallas was a Giant; Athena slew him during the Gigantomachy and flayed off his skin to make her cloak, which she wore as a victory trophy. In an alternative variation of the same myth, Pallas was instead Athena's father, who attempted to assault his own daughter, causing Athena to kill him and take his skin as a trophy.

The palladium was a statue of Athena that was said to have stood in her temple on the Trojan Acropolis. Athena was said to have carved the statue herself in the likeness of her dead friend Pallas. The statue had special talisman-like properties and it was thought that, as long as it was in the city, Troy could never fall. When the Greeks captured Troy, Cassandra, the daughter of Priam and Hecuba, clung to the palladium for protection, but Ajax the Lesser violently tore her away from it, dragged her over to the other captives and raped her. Athena was infuriated by this violation of her protection. Although Agamemnon attempted to placate her anger with sacrifices, Athena sent a storm at Cape Kaphereos to destroy almost the entire Greek fleet and scatter all of the surviving ships across the Aegean.

=== Glaukopis ===
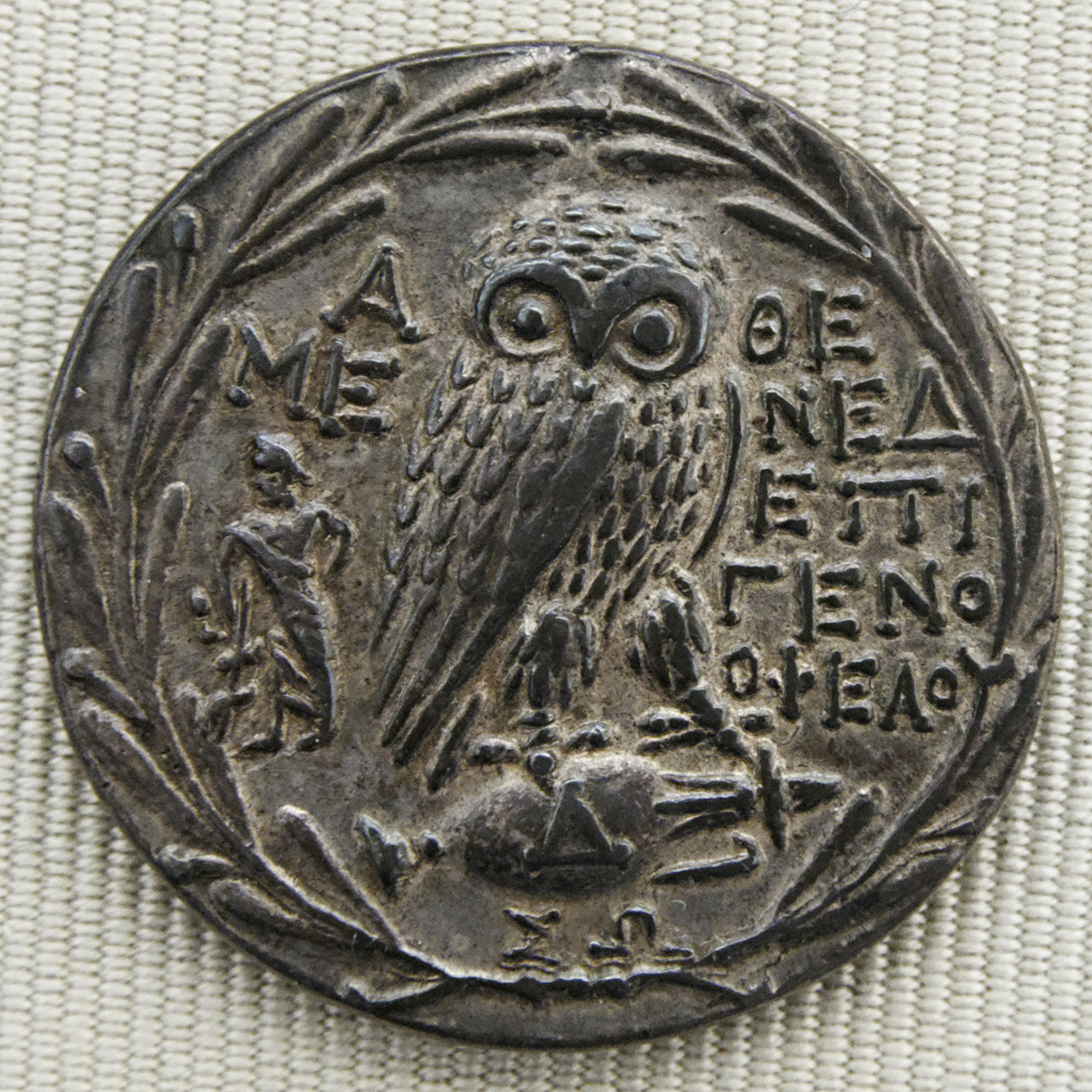
The owl of Athena, surrounded by an olive wreath. Reverse of an Athenian silver tetradrachm, c. 175 BC

In Homer's epic works, Athena's most common epithet is Glaukopis (γλαυκῶπις), which usually is translated as, "bright-eyed" or "with gleaming eyes". The word is a combination of glaukós (γλαυκός, meaning "gleaming, silvery", and later, "bluish-green" or "grey") and ṓps (ὤψ, "eye, face").

The word glaúx (γλαύξ), which refers to the little owl (Athene noctua), is from the same root, presumably because of the bird's own distinctive eyes. Athena was associated with the owl from very early on; in archaic images, she is frequently depicted with an owl perched on her hand. Through its association with Athena, the owl evolved into the national mascot of the Athenians and eventually became a symbol of wisdom.

=== Tritogeneia ===
In the Iliad (4.514), the Odyssey (3.378), the Homeric Hymns, and in Hesiod's Theogony, Athena is also given the curious epithet Tritogeneia (Τριτογένεια), whose significance remains unclear. It could mean various things, including "Triton-born", perhaps indicating that the homonymous sea-deity was her parent according to some early myths. One myth relates the foster father relationship of this Triton towards the half-orphan Athena, whom he raised alongside his own daughter Pallas. Kerényi suggests that "Tritogeneia did not mean that she came into the world on any particular river or lake, but that she was born of the water itself; for the name Triton seems to be associated with water generally." In Ovid's Metamorphoses, Athena is occasionally referred to as "Tritonia".

Another possible meaning may be "triple-born" or "third-born", which may refer to a triad or to her status as the third daughter of Zeus or the fact she was born from Metis, Zeus, and herself; various legends list her as being the first child after Artemis and Apollo, though other legends identify her as Zeus' first child. Several scholars have suggested a connection to the Rigvedic god Trita, who was sometimes grouped in a body of three mythological poets. Michael Janda has connected the myth of Trita to the scene in the Iliad in which the "three brothers" Zeus, Poseidon, and Hades divide the world between them, receiving the "broad sky", the sea, and the underworld respectively. Janda further connects the myth of Athena being born of the head (i. e. the uppermost part) of Zeus, understanding Trito- (which perhaps originally meant "the third") as another word for "the sky". In Janda's analysis of Indo-European mythology, this heavenly sphere is also associated with the mythological body of water surrounding the inhabited world (cfr. Triton's mother, Amphitrite, queen of Poseidon).

Yet another possible meaning is mentioned in Diogenes Laertius' biography of Democritus, that Athena was called "Tritogeneia" because three things, on which all mortal life depends, come from her.

== Cult and patronages ==
=== Panhellenic and Athenian cult ===
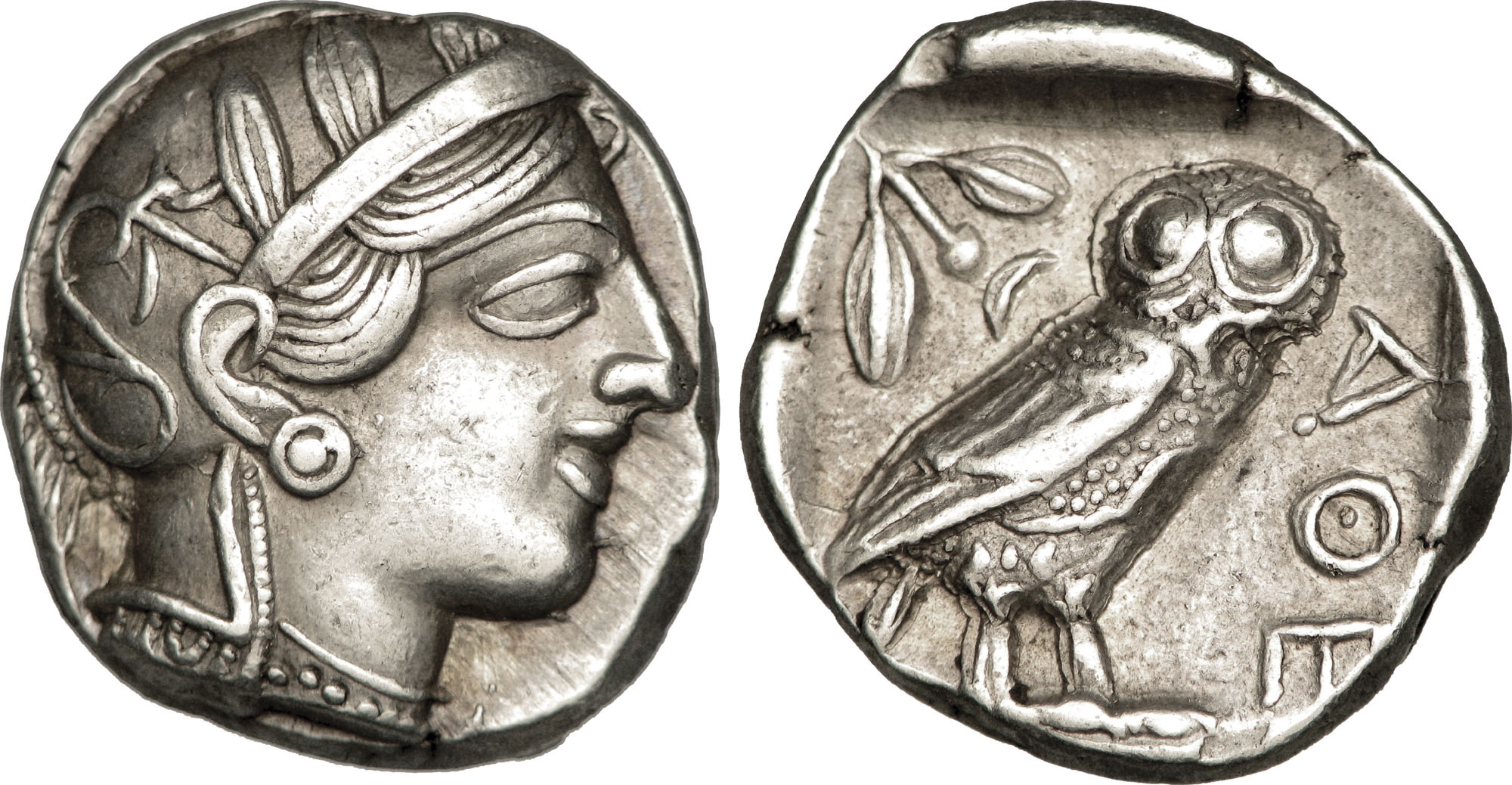
Athenian tetradrachm representing the goddess Athena

In her aspect of Athena Polias, Athena was venerated as the goddess of the city and the protectress of the citadel. In Athens, the Plynteria, or "Feast of the Bath", was observed every year at the end of the month of Thargelion. The festival lasted for five days. During this period, the priestesses of Athena, or plyntrídes, performed a cleansing ritual within the Erechtheion, a sanctuary devoted to Athena and Poseidon. Here Athena's statue was undressed, her clothes washed, and body purified. Athena was worshipped at festivals such as Chalceia as Athena Ergane, the patroness of various crafts, especially weaving. She was also the patron of metalworkers and was believed to aid in the forging of armour and weapons. During the late fifth century BC, the role of goddess of philosophy became a major aspect of Athena's cult.

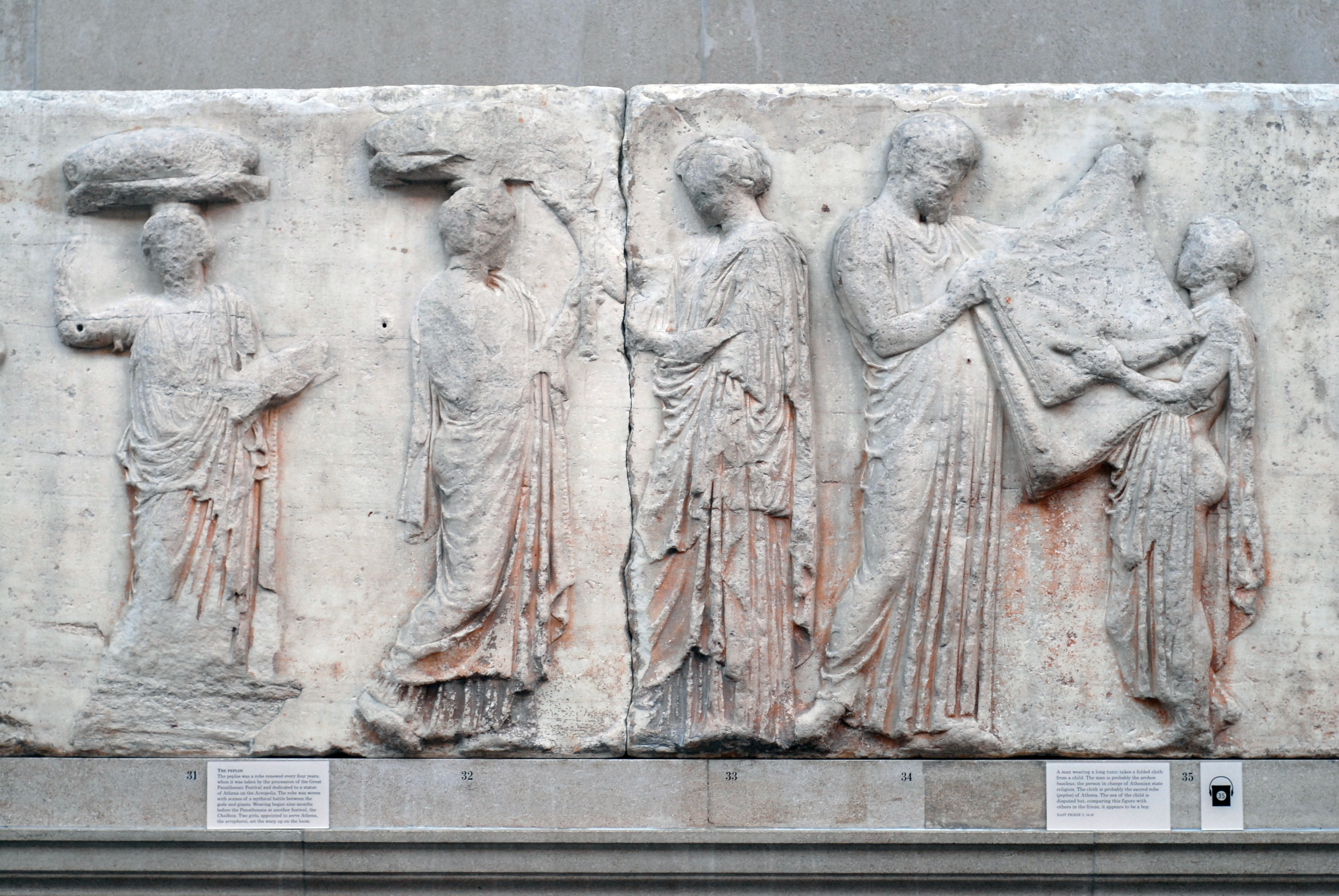
A new peplos was woven for Athena and ceremonially brought to dress her cult image (British Museum).

As Athena Promachos, she was believed to lead soldiers into battle. Athena represented the disciplined, strategic side of war, in contrast to her brother Ares, the patron of violence, bloodlust, and slaughter—"the raw force of war". Athena was believed to only support those fighting for a just cause and was thought to view war primarily as a means to resolve conflict. The Greeks regarded Athena with much higher esteem than Ares. Athena was especially worshipped in this role during the festivals of the Panathenaea and Pamboeotia, both of which prominently featured displays of athletic and military prowess. As the patroness of heroes and warriors, Athena was believed to favour those who used cunning and intelligence rather than brute strength.

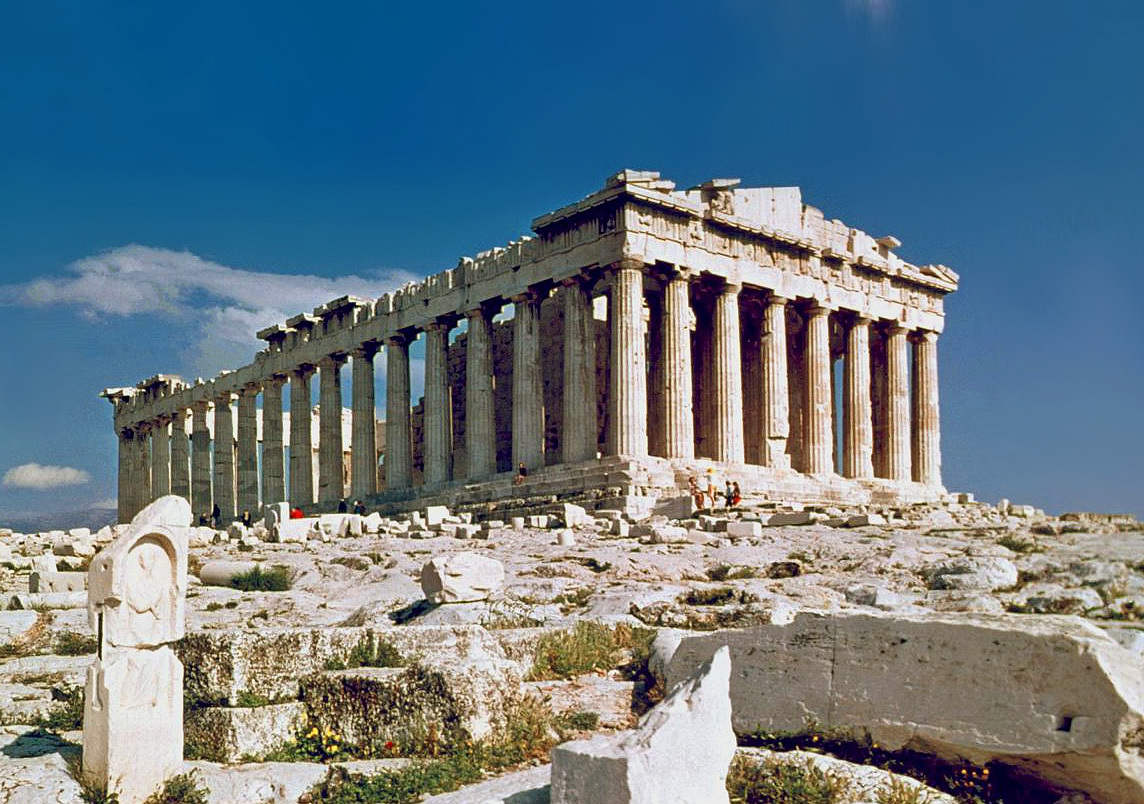
The Parthenon on the Athenian Acropolis, which is dedicated to Athena Parthenos

In her aspect as a warrior maiden, Athena was known as Parthenos (Παρθένος "virgin"), because, like her fellow goddesses Artemis and Hestia, she was believed to remain perpetually a virgin. Athena's most famous temple, the Parthenon on the Athenian Acropolis, takes its name from this title. According to Karl Kerényi, a scholar of Greek mythology, the name Parthenos is not merely an observation of Athena's virginity, but also a recognition of her role as enforcer of rules of sexual modesty and ritual mystery. Even beyond recognition, the Athenians allotted the goddess value based on this pureness of virginity, which they upheld as a rudiment of female behaviour. Kerényi's study and theory of Athena explains her virginal epithet as a result of her relationship to her father Zeus and a vital, cohesive piece of her character throughout the ages. This role is expressed in several stories about Athena. Marinus of Neapolis reports that when Christians removed the statue of the goddess from the Parthenon, a beautiful woman appeared in a dream to Proclus, a devotee of Athena, and announced that the "Athenian Lady" wished to dwell with him.

Athena was also credited with creating the pebble-based form of divination. Those pebbles were called thriai, which was also the collective name of a group of nymphs with prophetic powers. Her half-brother Apollo, however, angered and spiteful at the practitioners of an art rival to his own, complained to their father Zeus about it, with the pretext that many people took to casting pebbles, but few actually were true prophets. Zeus, sympathising with Apollo's grievances, discredited the pebble divination by rendering the pebbles useless. Apollo's words became the basis of an ancient Greek idiom.

=== Regional cults ===
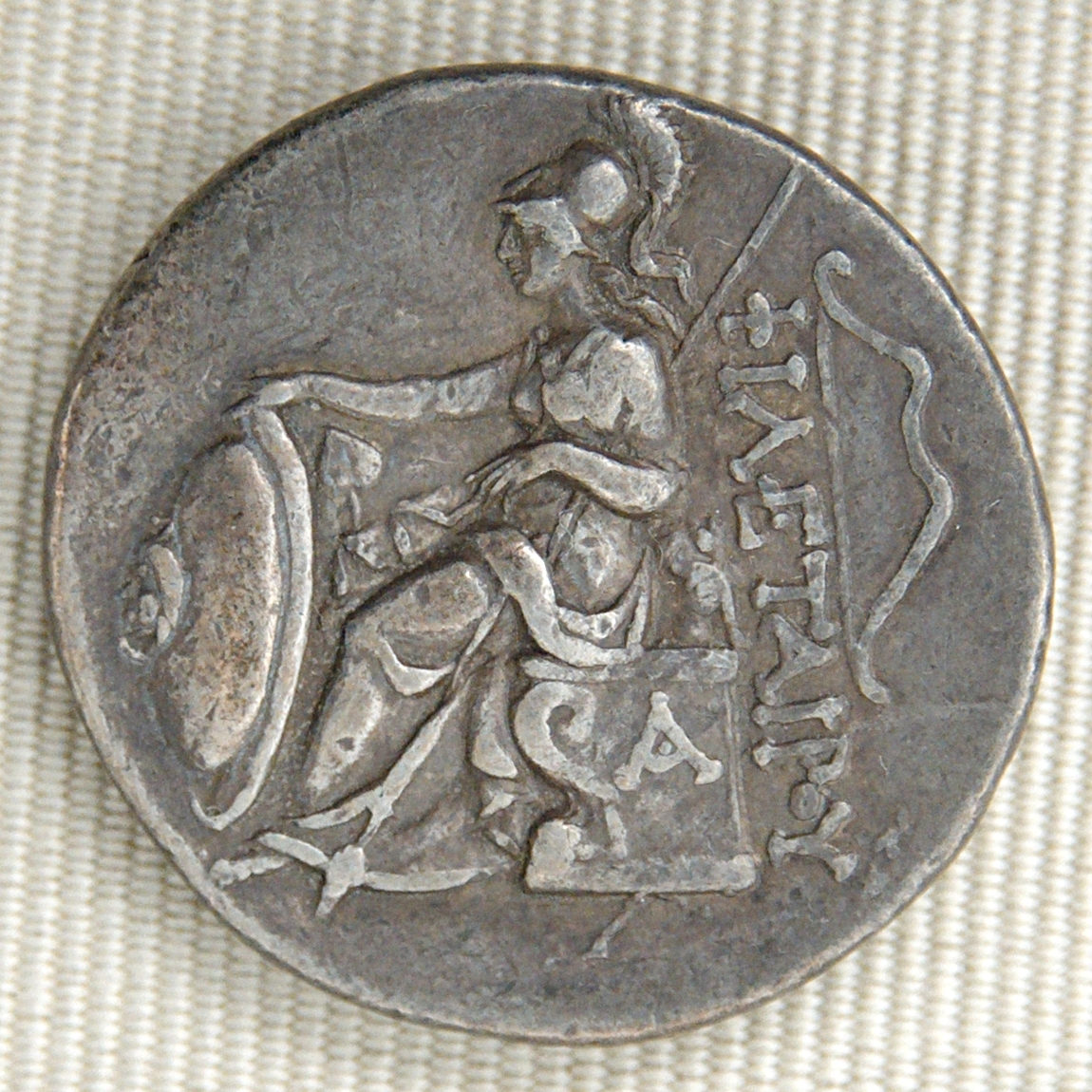
Reverse side of a Pergamene silver tetradrachm minted by Eumenes I (r. 263–241 BC), showing Athena seated on a throne

Athena was not only the patron goddess of Athens, but also other cities, including Pergamon, Argos, Sparta, Gortyn, Lindos, and Larisa. An important center of her cult was Rhodes, home of the Temple of Athena Lindia. The various cults of Athena were all branches of her panhellenic cult and often proctored various initiation rites of Grecian youth, such as the passage into citizenship by young men or the passage of young women into marriage. These cults were portals of a uniform socialisation, even beyond mainland Greece. Athena was frequently equated with Aphaea, a local goddess of the island of Aegina, originally from Crete and also associated with Artemis and the nymph Britomartis. In Arcadia, she was assimilated with the ancient goddess Alea and worshiped as Athena Alea. Sanctuaries dedicated to Athena Alea were located in the Laconian towns of Mantineia and Tegea. The temple of Athena Alea in Tegea was an important religious centre of ancient Greece. (Note: "This sanctuary had been respected from early days by all the Peloponnesians, and afforded peculiar safety to its suppliants" (Pausanias, Description of Greece iii.5.6)) The geographer Pausanias was informed that the temenos had been founded by Aleus.

Athena had a major temple on the Spartan Acropolis, where she was venerated as Poliouchos and Khalkíoikos ("of the Brazen House", often Latinised as Chalcioecus). This epithet may refer to the fact that cult statue held there may have been made of bronze, that the walls of the temple itself may have been made of bronze, or that Athena was the patron of metal-workers. Bells made of terracotta and bronze were used in Sparta as part of Athena's cult. An Ionic-style temple to Athena Polias was built at Priene in the fourth century BC. It was designed by Pytheos of Priene, the same architect who designed the Mausoleum at Halicarnassus. The temple was dedicated by Alexander the Great and an inscription from the temple declaring his dedication is now held in the British Museum. She was worshipped as Athena Asia in Colchis – supposedly on an account of a nearby mountain with that name – from which her worship was believed to have been brought by Castor and Pollux to Laconia, where a temple was built to her at Las.

Athena's virginal character was common across the Hellenic world, but could be deviated from by local traditions which portrayed her as a mother. In one myth Apollo is called a son of Hephaestus and Athena, "a legend which may have arisen at the time when the lonians introduced the worship of Apollo into Attica, and when this new divinity was placed in some family connection with the ancient goddess of the country." In another she had a child with Hephaestus named Lychnus. According to Strabo's Geographica, a tradition in Rhodes held that she was mother of the Korybantes and consort of Helios.

Athena Cyrrhestica worshiped in the city of Cyrrhus in the Cyrrhestica province of Syria.

In Pergamon, Athena was thought to have been a god of the cosmos and the aspects of it that aided Pergamon and its fate.

== Mythology ==
=== Birth ===
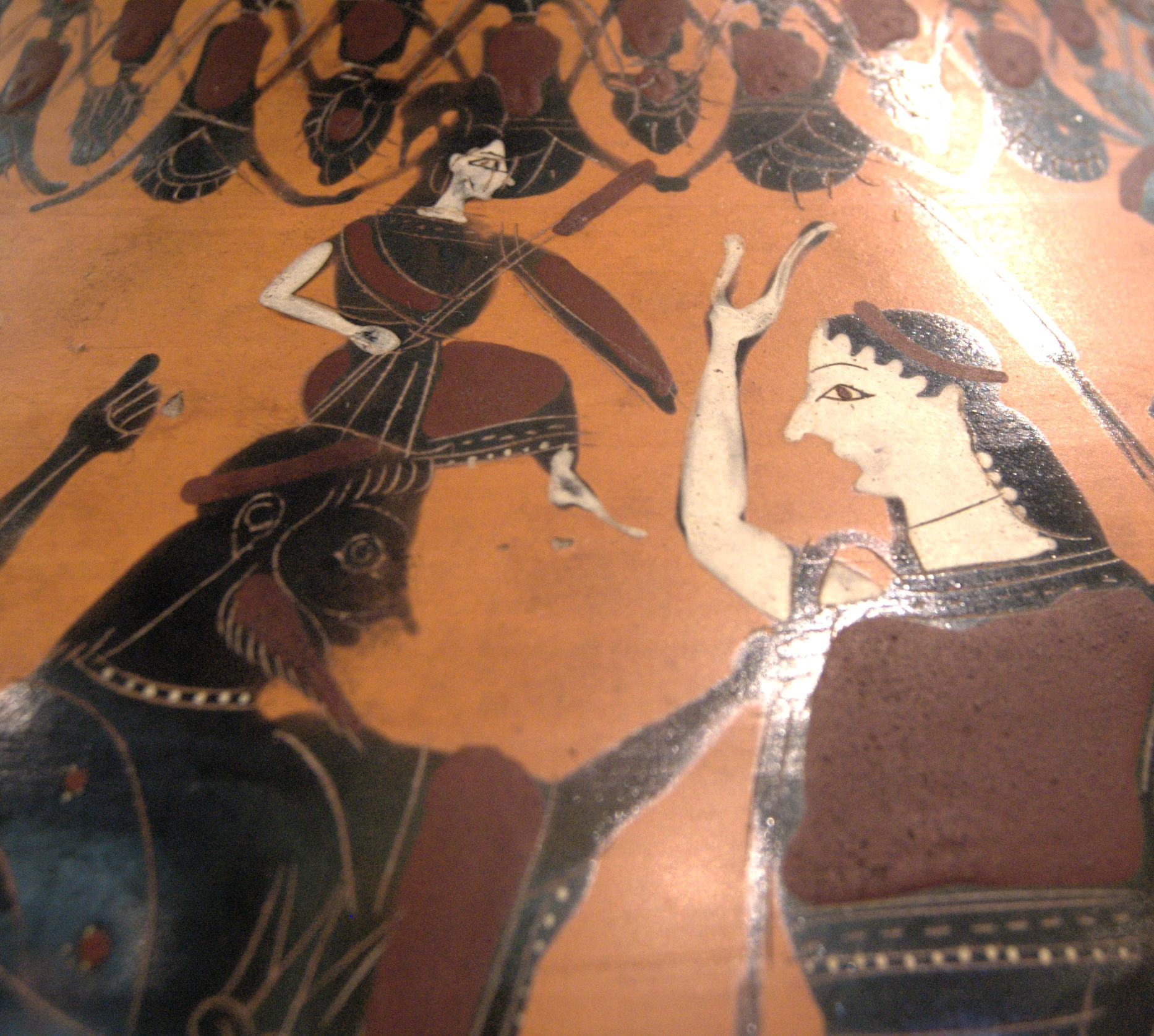
Athena is "born" from Zeus's forehead parthenogenetically as he grasps the clothing of Eileithyia on the right; black-figured amphora, 550–525 BC, Louvre.

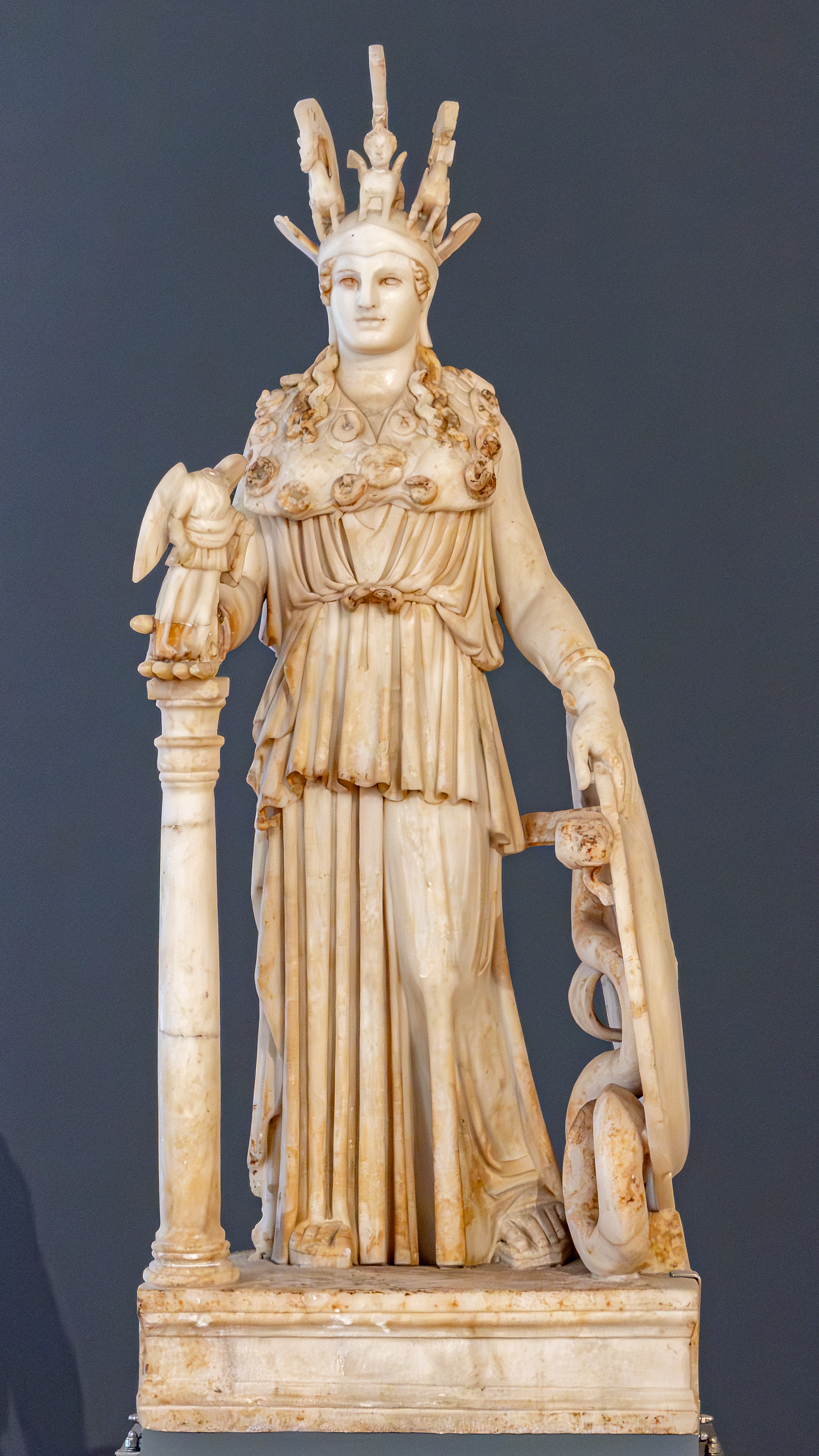
The Varvakeion Athena, the most faithful copy of the Athena Parthenos, as displayed in the National Archaeological Museum, Athens.

In the classical Olympian pantheon, Athena was regarded as the favourite child of Zeus, the king of the gods, born fully armed from his forehead. Since her birth, she possessed great power. (Note: Jane Ellen Harrison's famous characterisation of this myth-element as, "a desperate theological expedient to rid an earth-born Kore of her matriarchal conditions" (Harrison 1922:302) has never been refuted nor confirmed.) The story of her birth comes in several versions. The earliest mention is in Book V of the Iliad, when Ares accused Zeus of being biased in favour of Athena because "autos egeinao" (literally "you fathered her", but probably intended as "you gave birth to her").

In the version recounted by Hesiod in his Theogony, Zeus married Metis, who is described as the "wisest among gods and mortal men", and engaged in sexual intercourse with her. After learning that Metis was pregnant, however, he became afraid that the unborn offspring would try to overthrow him, because Gaia and Ouranos had prophesied that Metis would bear a son wiser and more powerful than his father who would overthrow him. In order to prevent this, Zeus tricked Metis into letting him swallow her, but it was too late because she had already conceived and soon gave birth to their daughter Athena, whom Metis raised inside of his mind, where she continues to give him advice as a ruler. When Athena grew up, Metis forged robes, armour, a shield and a spear for her daughter. A later account of the story from the Bibliotheca of Pseudo-Apollodorus, written in the second century AD, makes Metis Zeus's unwilling sexual partner, rather than his wife. According to this version of the story, Metis transformed into many different shapes in effort to escape Zeus, but Zeus successfully raped her and swallowed her.

After swallowing Metis, according to Hesiod, Zeus took six more wives in succession until he married his seventh and present wife, Hera. Then Zeus experienced an enormous headache. He was in such pain that he ordered someone (either Prometheus, Hephaestus, Hermes, Ares, or Palaemon, depending on the sources examined) to cleave his head open with the labrys, the double-headed Minoan axe. Athena leaped from Zeus's head, often fully grown and armed. The "First Homeric Hymn to Athena" states in lines 9–16 that the gods were awestruck by Athena's appearance and even Helios, the god of the sun, stopped his chariot in the sky. Pindar, in his "Seventh Olympian Ode", states that she "cried aloud with a mighty shout" and that "the Sky and mother Earth shuddered before her".

Hesiod states that Hera was so annoyed at Zeus for having given birth to a child on his own that she conceived and bore Hephaestus by herself, but in Imagines 2. 27 (trans. Fairbanks), the third-century AD Greek rhetorician Philostratus the Elder writes that Hera "rejoices" at Athena's birth "as though Athena were her daughter also". The second-century AD Christian apologist Justin Martyr takes issue with those pagans who erect at springs images of Kore, whom he interprets as Athena: "They said that Athena was the daughter of Zeus not from intercourse, but when the god had in mind the making of a world through a word (logos) his first thought was Athena." According to a rare account of the story in a scholium on the Iliad, when Zeus swallowed Metis, she was pregnant with Athena by the Cyclops Brontes. The Etymologicum Magnum instead deems Athena the daughter of the Daktyl Itonos. Fragments attributed by the Christian Eusebius of Caesarea to the semi-legendary Phoenician historian Sanchuniathon, which Eusebius thought had been written before the Trojan War, make Athena instead the daughter of Cronus, a king of Byblos who visited "the inhabitable world" and bequeathed Attica to Athena.

Athena, born a daughter instead of the son of the prophecy Hesiod described, never successfully overthrew her father Zeus as the ruler of the cosmos; but Homer' Iliad tells of an attempted overthrow, in which she, Hera and Poseidon conspired to overpower Zeus and tie him in bonds. It is only because of the Nereid Thetis, who summoned Briareus, one of the Hecatoncheires, to Mount Olympus, that the other gods abandon their plans (out of fear for Briareus).

=== Lady of Athens ===
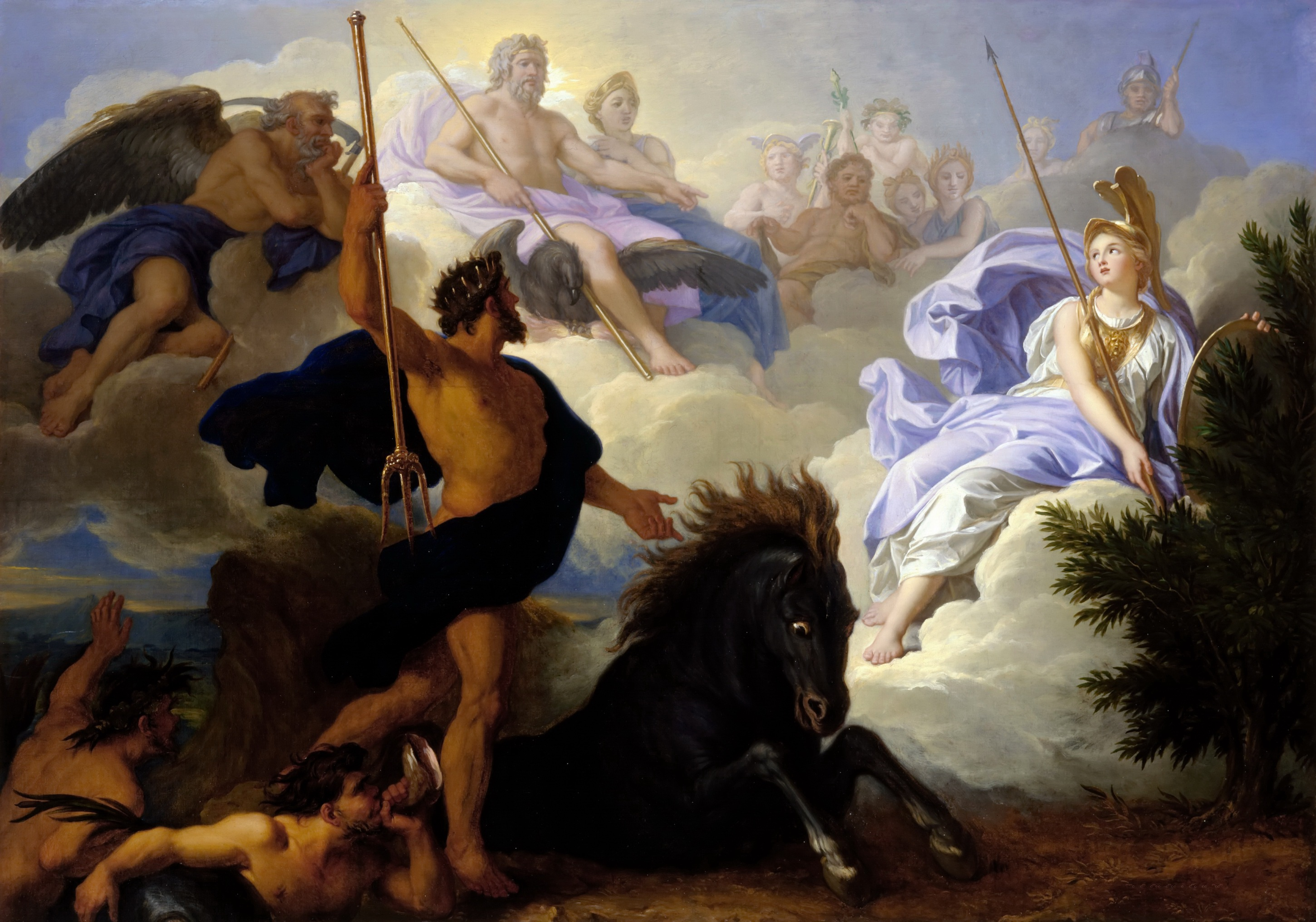
The Dispute of Minerva and Neptune by René-Antoine Houasse (c. 1689 or 1706)

As the goddess of war, good counsel, prudent restraint and practical insight, Athena became the guardian of the welfare of kings. In a founding myth reported by Pseudo-Apollodorus, she competed with Poseidon for the patronage of Athens. They agreed that each would give the Athenians one gift and that Cecrops, the king of Athens, would determine which gift was better. Poseidon struck the ground with his trident and a salt water spring sprang up; this gave the Athenians access to trade and water. Athens at its height was a significant sea power, defeating the Persian fleet at the Battle of Salamis—but the water was salty and undrinkable. In an alternative version of the myth from Vergil's Georgics, Poseidon instead gave the Athenians the first horse. Athena offered the first domesticated olive tree. Cecrops accepted this gift and declared Athena the patron goddess of Athens. The olive tree brought wood, oil, and food, and became a symbol of Athenian economic prosperity. Robert Graves was of the opinion that "Poseidon's attempts to take possession of certain cities are political myths", which reflect the conflict between matriarchal and patriarchal religions.

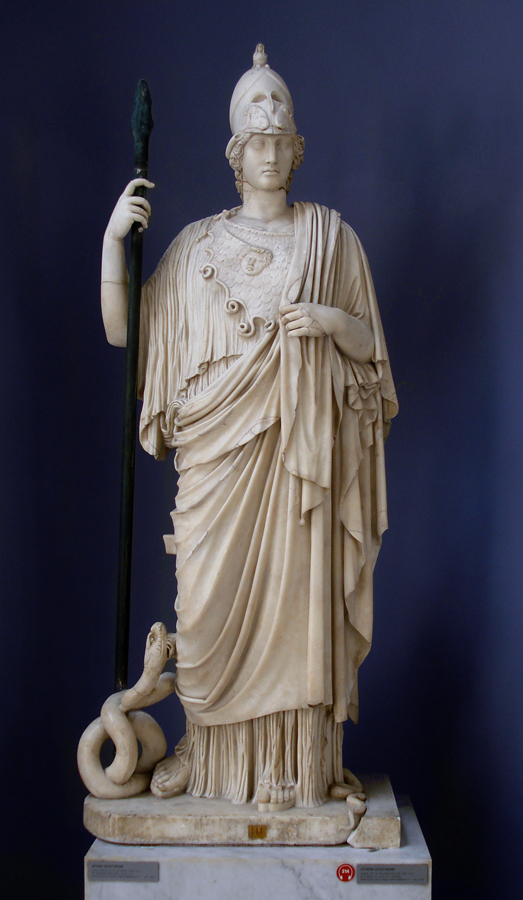
The Athena Giustiniani, a Roman copy of a Greek statue of Pallas Athena. The guardian serpent of the Athenian Acropolis sits coiled at her feet.

Afterwards, Poseidon was so angry over his defeat that he sent one of his sons, Halirrhothius, to cut down the tree. But as he swung his axe, he missed his aim and it fell in himself, killing him. This was supposedly the origin of calling Athena's sacred olive tree moria, for Halirrhotius's attempt at revenge proved fatal (moros in Greek). Poseidon in fury accused Ares of murder, and the matter was eventually settled on the Areopagus ("hill of Ares") in favour of Ares, which was thereafter named after the event.

Pseudo-Apollodorus records an archaic legend, which claims that Hephaestus once attempted to rape Athena, but she pushed him away, causing him to ejaculate on her thigh. Athena wiped the semen off using a tuft of wool, which she tossed into the dust, impregnating Gaia and causing her to give birth to Erichthonius. Athena adopted Erichthonius as her son and raised him. The Fabulae, a work of Roman mythography attributed to Gaius Julius Hyginus, records a similar story in which Hephaestus demanded Zeus to let him marry Athena since he was the one who had smashed open Zeus's skull, allowing Athena to be born. Zeus agreed to this and Hephaestus and Athena were married, but, when Hephaestus was about to consummate the union, Athena vanished from the bridal bed, causing him to ejaculate on the floor, thus impregnating Gaia with Erichthonius.

The geographer Pausanias records that Athena went to place the infant Erichthonius into a small chest (cista), which she entrusted to the care of the three daughters of Cecrops: Herse, Pandrosos, and Aglauros of Athens. She warned the three sisters not to open the chest, but did not explain to them why or what was in it. Aglauros, and possibly one of the other sisters, opened the chest. Differing reports say that they either found that the child itself was a serpent, that it was guarded by a serpent, that it was guarded by two serpents, or that it had the legs of a serpent. In Pausanias's story, the two sisters were driven mad by the sight of the chest's contents and hurled themselves off the Acropolis, dying instantly, but an Attic vase painting shows them being chased by the serpent off the edge of the cliff instead. An alternative version of the story is that Athena left the box with the daughters of Cecrops while she went to fetch a limestone mountain from the Pallene peninsula to use in the Acropolis. While she was away, Aglaurus and Herse opened the box. A crow saw them open the box, and flew away to tell Athena, who fell into a rage and dropped the mountain she was carrying which became Mount Lycabettus.

Another version of the myth of the Athenian maidens is told in Metamorphoses by the Roman poet Ovid (43 BC – 17 AD); in this late variant Hermes falls in love with Herse. Herse, Aglaulus, and Pandrosus go to the temple to offer sacrifices to Athena. Hermes demands help from Aglaulus to seduce Herse. Aglaulus demands money in exchange. Hermes gives her the money the sisters have already offered to Athena. As punishment for Aglaulus's greed, Athena asks the goddess Envy to make Aglaulus jealous of Herse. When Hermes arrives to seduce Herse, Aglaulus stands in his way instead of helping him as she had agreed. He turns her to stone.

Erichthonius was one of the most important founding heroes of Athens and the legend of the daughters of Cecrops was a cult myth linked to the rituals of the Arrhephoria festival. Pausanias records that, during the Arrhephoria, two young girls known as the Arrhephoroi, who lived near the temple of Athena Polias, would be given hidden objects by the priestess of Athena, which they would carry on their heads down a natural underground passage. They would leave the objects they had been given at the bottom of the passage and take another set of hidden objects, which they would carry on their heads back up to the temple. The ritual was performed in the dead of night and no one, not even the priestess, knew what the objects were. The serpent in the story may be the same one depicted coiled at Athena's feet in Pheidias's famous statue of the Athena Parthenos in the Parthenon. Many of the surviving sculptures of Athena show this serpent. Herodotus records that a serpent lived in a crevice on the north side of the summit of the Athenian Acropolis and that the Athenians left a honey cake for it each month as an offering. On the eve of the Second Persian invasion of Greece in 480 BC, the serpent did not eat the honey cake and the Athenians interpreted it as a sign that Athena herself had abandoned them.

Athena gave her favour to an Attic girl named Myrsine, a chaste girl who outdid all her fellow athletes in both the palaestra and the race. Out of envy, the other athletes murdered her, but Athena took pity in her and transformed her dead body into a myrtle, a plant thereafter as favoured by her as the olive was. An almost exact story was said about another girl, Elaea, who transformed into an olive, Athena's sacred tree.

According to Ovid, one day as the mortal maiden Corone was walking by the seashore, Poseidon saw her and attempted to seduce her. When his efforts failed, he attempted to rape her instead. However, Corone fled from his rapacious advances, crying out to men and gods. While no man heard her, "the virgin goddess feels pity for a virgin"; Athena saved her by transforming her into a crow.

After the deaths of their parents, the orphaned Cleothera and Merope were raised by Aphrodite. The other Olympian goddesses also blessed the girls with gifts and blessings; Hera gave them beauty, Artemis high stature, and Athena taught them women's crafts.

=== Patron of heroes ===
In Homer's Iliad, Athena, as a war goddess, inspired and fought alongside the Greek heroes; her aid was synonymous with military prowess. Zeus, the chief god, specifically assigned the sphere of war to Ares, the god of war, and Athena. Athena's moral and military superiority to Ares derived in part from the fact that she represented the intellectual and civilised side of war and the virtues of justice and skill, whereas Ares represented mere blood lust. Her superiority also derived in part from the vastly greater variety and importance of her functions and the patriotism of Homer's predecessors, Ares being of foreign origin. In the Iliad, Athena was the divine form of the heroic, martial ideal: she personified excellence in close combat and glory, and was personally attended by Nike, the goddess of victory. The qualities that led to victory were found on the aegis, or breastplate, that Athena wore when she went to war: fear, strife, defence, and assault.

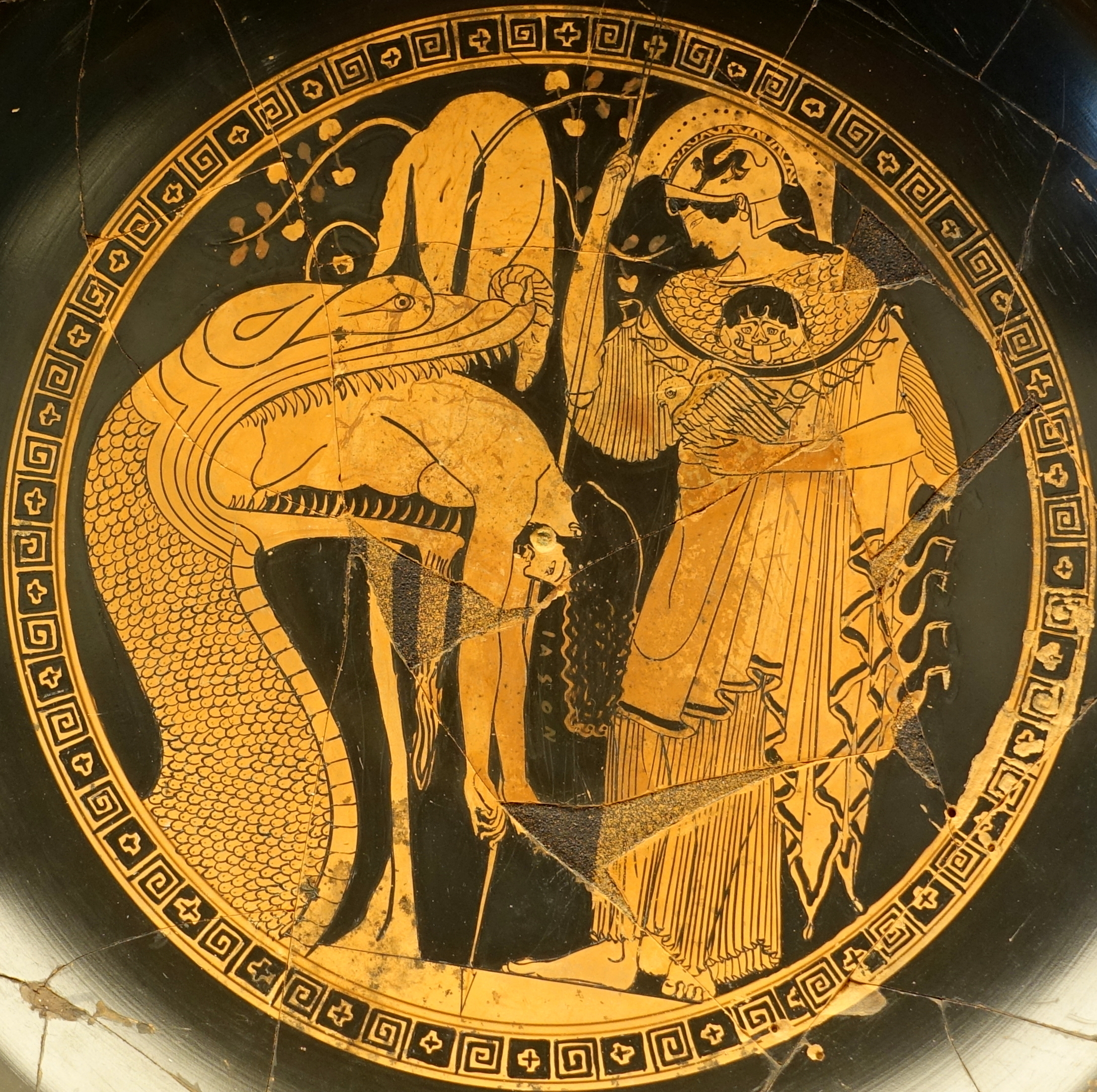
Attic red-figure kylix painting from c. 480-470 BC showing Athena observing as the Colchian dragon disgorges the hero Jason

According to Pseudo-Apollodorus's Bibliotheca, Athena advised Argos, the builder of the Argo, the ship on which the hero Jason and his band of Argonauts sailed, and aided in the ship's construction. According to Pindar's Thirteenth Olympian Ode, Athena helped the hero Bellerophon tame the winged horse Pegasus by giving him a bit. In Aeschylus's tragedy Orestes, Athena intervenes to save Orestes from the wrath of the Erinyes and presides over his trial for the murder of his mother Clytemnestra. When half the jury votes to acquit and the other half votes to convict, Athena casts the deciding vote to acquit Orestes and declares that, from then on, whenever a jury is tied, the defendant shall always be acquitted.

Pseudo-Apollodorus also records that Athena guided the hero Perseus in his quest to behead Medusa. She and Hermes, the god of travellers, appeared to Perseus after he set off on his quest and gifted him with tools he would need to kill the Gorgon. Athena lent Perseus her polished bronze shield to view Medusa's reflection without becoming petrified himself. Hermes lent Perseus his harpe to behead Medusa with. When Perseus swung the blade to behead Medusa, Athena guided it, allowing the blade to cut the Gorgon's head clean off.

In ancient Greek art, Athena is frequently shown aiding the hero Heracles. She appears in four of the twelve metopes on the Temple of Zeus at Olympia depicting Heracles's Twelve Labors, including the first, in which she simply watches him slay the Nemean lion after having told him how to use the lion's own claws to skin the pelt, and in the tenth, in which she is shown actively helping him hold up the sky itself. According to Apollodorus, on Athena's advice, Heracles dragged Alcyoneus, one of the two strongest Giants alongside Porphyrion, beyond the borders of his native land, where he was immortal, and then fatally shot him (compare with Antaeus). She is presented as Heracles' "stern ally", but also the "gentle ... acknowledger of his achievements". Artistic depictions of Heracles's apotheosis show Athena driving him to Mount Olympus in her chariot and presenting him to Zeus for his deification.

In The Odyssey, Odysseus' cunning and shrewd nature quickly wins Athena's favour. For the first part of the poem, however, she largely is confined to aiding him only from afar, mainly by implanting thoughts in his head during his journey home from Troy. Her guiding actions reinforce her role as the "protectress of heroes", or, as mythologian Walter Friedrich Otto dubbed her, the "goddess of nearness", due to her mentoring and motherly probing. It is not until he washes up on the shore of the island of the Phaeacians, where Nausicaa is washing her clothes that Athena arrives personally to provide more tangible assistance. She appears in Nausicaa's dreams to ensure that the princess rescues Odysseus and plays a role in his eventual escort to Ithaca. Athena appears to Odysseus upon his arrival, disguised as a herdsman; she initially lies and tells him that Penelope, his wife, has remarried and that he is believed to be dead, but Odysseus lies back to her, employing skilful prevarications to protect himself. Impressed by his resolve and shrewdness, she reveals herself and tells him what he needs to know to win back his kingdom. She disguises him as an elderly beggar so that he will not be recognised by the suitors or Penelope, and helps him to defeat the suitors. Athena also appears to Odysseus's son Telemachus. Her actions lead him to travel around to Odysseus's comrades and ask about his father. He hears stories about some of Odysseus's journey. Athena's push for Telemachus's journey helps him grow into the man role, that his father once held. She also plays a role in ending the resultant feud against the suitors' relatives. She instructs Laertes to throw his spear and to kill Eupeithes, the father of Antinous.

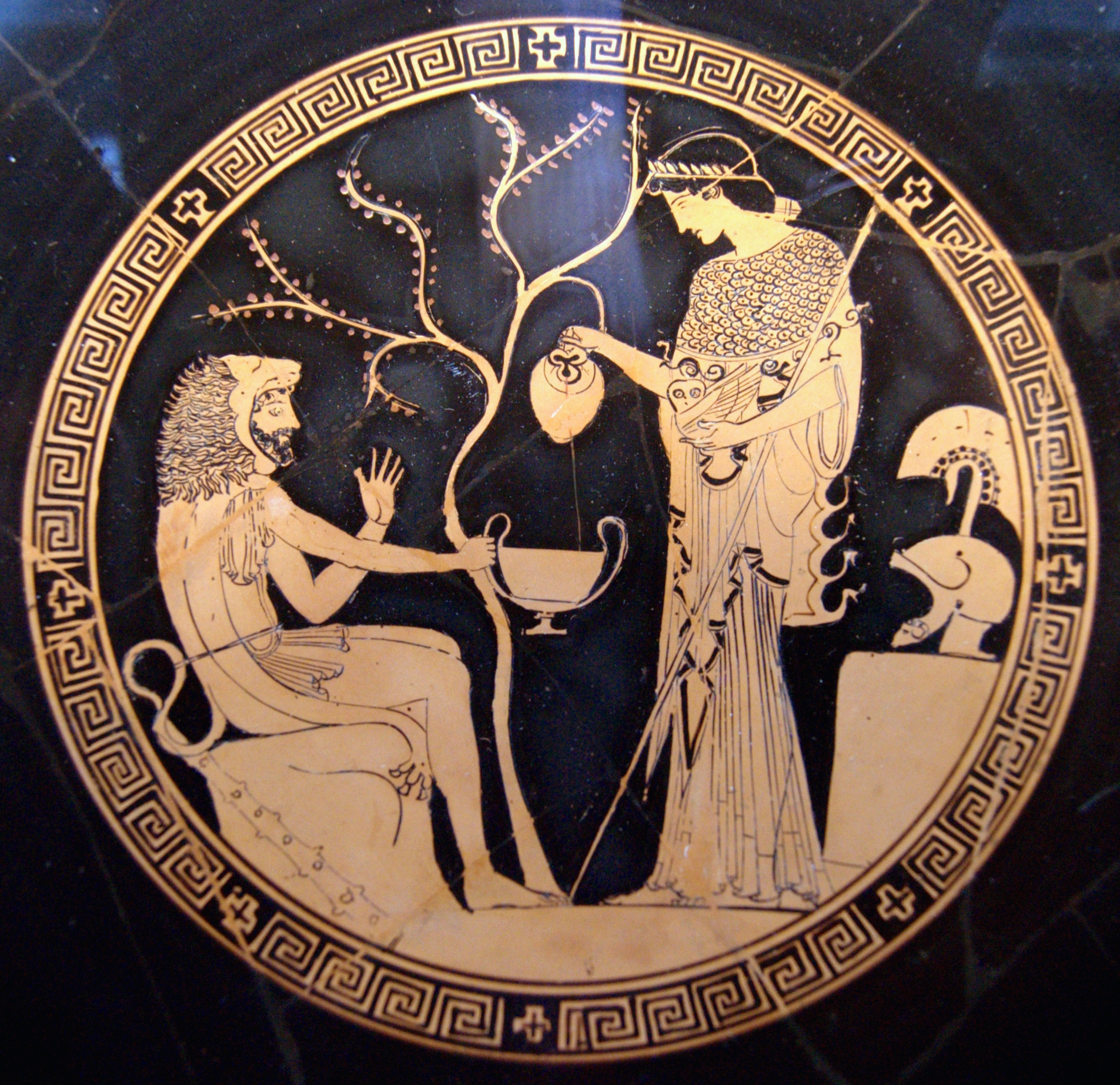
Athena and Heracles on an Attic red-figure kylix, 480–470 BC

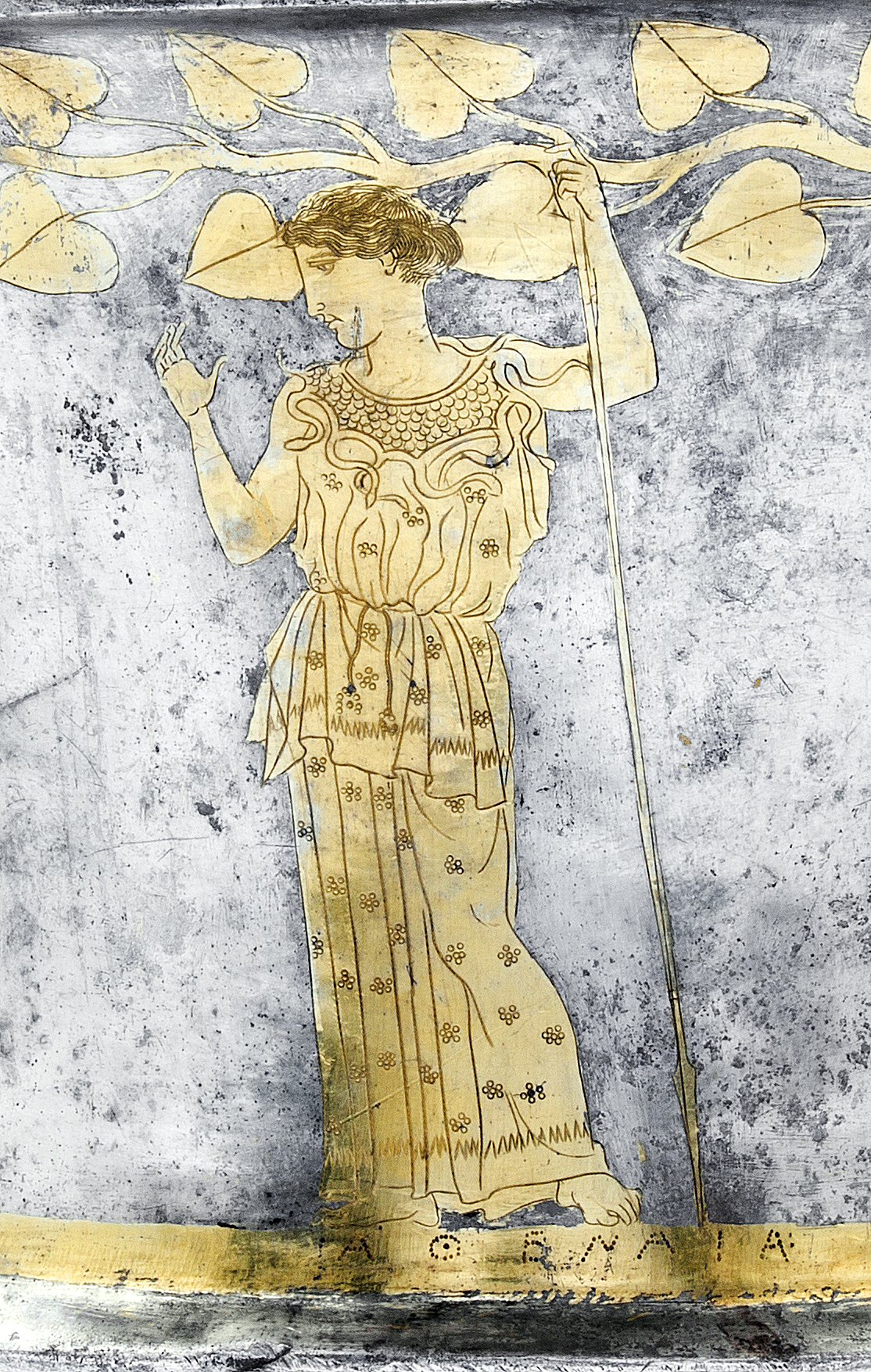
Athena, detail from a silver kantharos with Theseus in Crete (c. 440-435 BC), part of the Vassil Bojkov collection, Sofia, Bulgaria

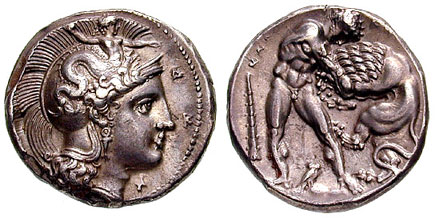
Silver coin showing Athena with Scylla decorated helmet and Heracles fighting the Nemean lion (Heraclea Lucania, 390-340 BC)

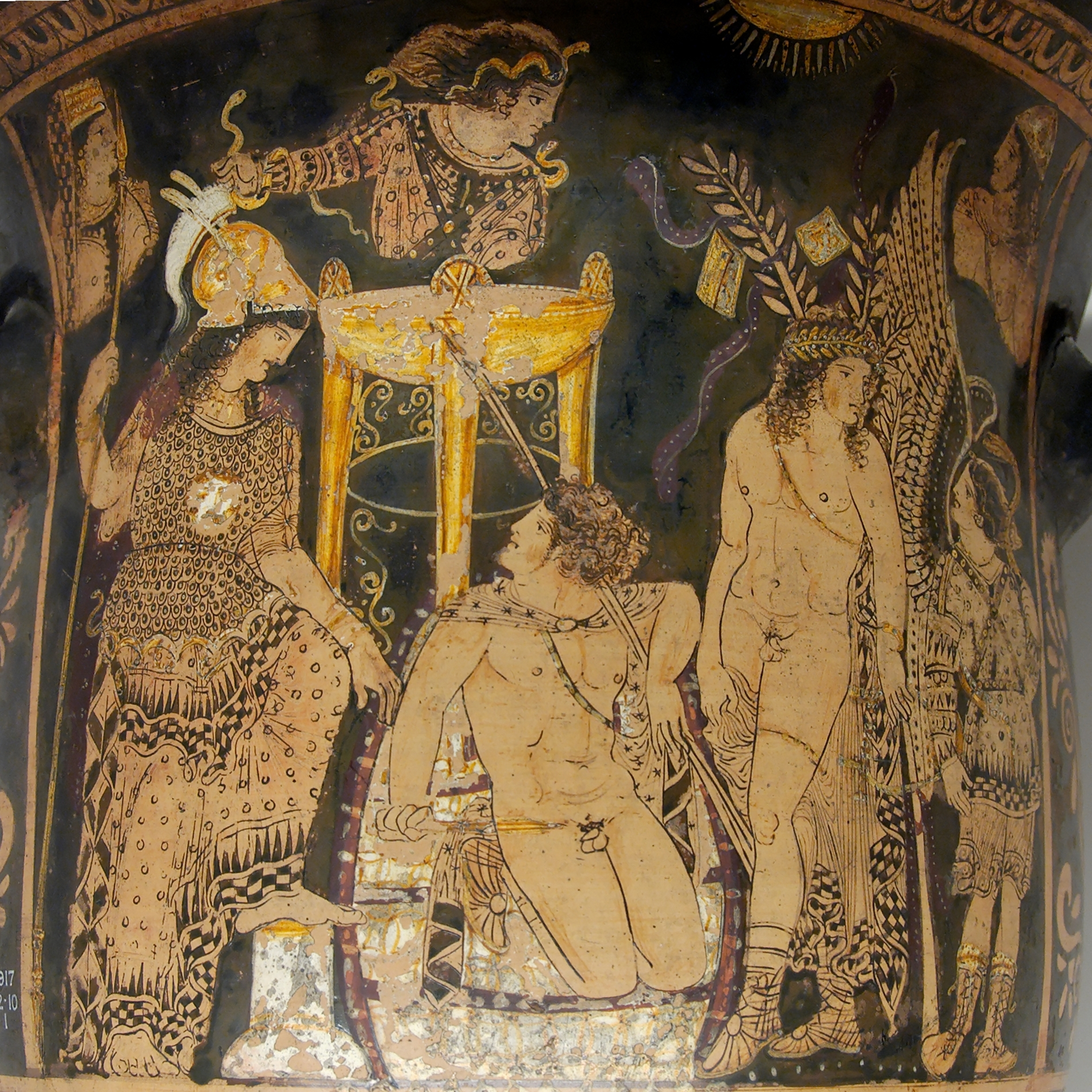
Paestan red-figure bell-krater (c. 330 BC), showing Orestes at Delphi flanked by Athena and Pylades among the Erinyes and priestesses of Apollo, with the Pythia sitting behind them on her tripod

=== Punishment myths ===
A myth told by the early third-century BC Hellenistic poet Callimachus in his Hymn 5 begins with Athena bathing in a spring on Mount Helicon at midday with one of her favourite companions, the nymph Chariclo. Chariclo's son Tiresias happened to be hunting on the same mountain and came to the spring searching for water. He inadvertently saw Athena naked, so she struck him blind to ensure he would never again see what man was not intended to see. Chariclo intervened on her son's behalf and begged Athena to have mercy. Athena replied that she could not restore Tiresias's eyesight, so, instead, she gave him the ability to understand the language of the birds and thus foretell the future.

Myrmex was a clever and chaste Attic girl who became quickly a favourite of Athena. However, when Athena invented the plough, Myrmex went to the Atticans and told them that it was in fact her own invention. Hurt by the girl's betrayal, Athena transformed her into the small insect bearing her name, the ant.

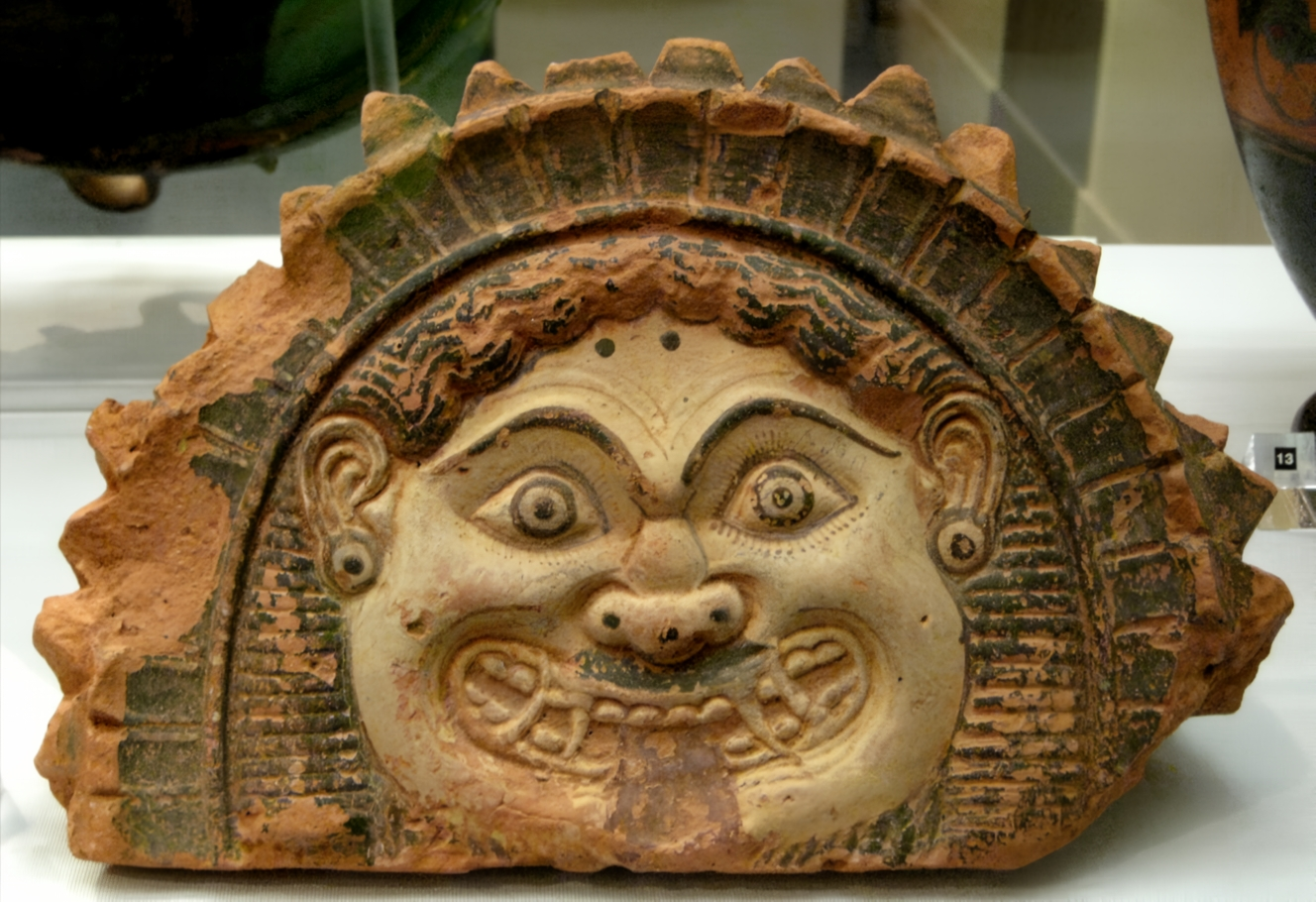
Classical Greek depiction of Medusa from the fourth century BC

In his Twelfth Pythian Ode, Pindar recounts the story of how Athena invented the aulos, a kind of flute, in imitation of the lamentations of Medusa's sisters, the Gorgons, after she was beheaded by the hero Perseus. According to Pindar, Athena gave the aulos to mortals as a gift. Later, the comic playwright Melanippides of Melos (c. 480–430 BC) embellished the story in his comedy Marsyas, claiming that Athena looked in the mirror while she was playing the aulos and saw how blowing into it puffed up her cheeks and made her look silly, so she threw the aulos away and cursed it so that whoever picked it up would meet an awful death. The aulos was picked up by the satyr Marsyas, who was later killed by Apollo for his hubris. Later, this version of the story became accepted as canonical and the Athenian sculptor Myron created a group of bronze sculptures based on it, which was installed before the western front of the Parthenon in around 440 BC.

In a rare version of the fable of Arachne, surviving in the scholia of an unnamed scholiast on Nicander, Arachne is a girl in Attica with a brother named Phalanx. Athena taught Arachne the art of weaving and Phalanx the art of war, but when brother and sister laid together in bed, Athena was so disgusted with them that she turned them both into spiders, animals forever doomed to be eaten by their own young.

According to Book VIII (236–59) of Ovid's Metamorphoses, Daedalus was so proud of his achievements as an inventor that he could not bear the idea of a rival. His sister had placed her son Perdix under his charge to be taught the mechanical arts. While walking on the seashore, he picked up the spine of a fish or a serpent's jaw. Imitating it, he took a piece of iron and notched it on the edge, thus inventing the saw. Daedalus was so envious of his nephew's accomplishments that he took an opportunity, when they were together one day on the top of a high tower, to push him off, but Athena, who favours ingenuity, saw him falling and saved his life by changing him into a bird called after his name, the perdix (partridge). This bird does not build its nest in the trees, nor take lofty flights, but nestles in the hedges, and mindful of his fall, avoids high places. For this crime, Daedalus was tried and banished. In some accounts, she leaves Daedalus with a scar in the shape of a partridge, to always remind him of his crime.

=== Trojan War ===
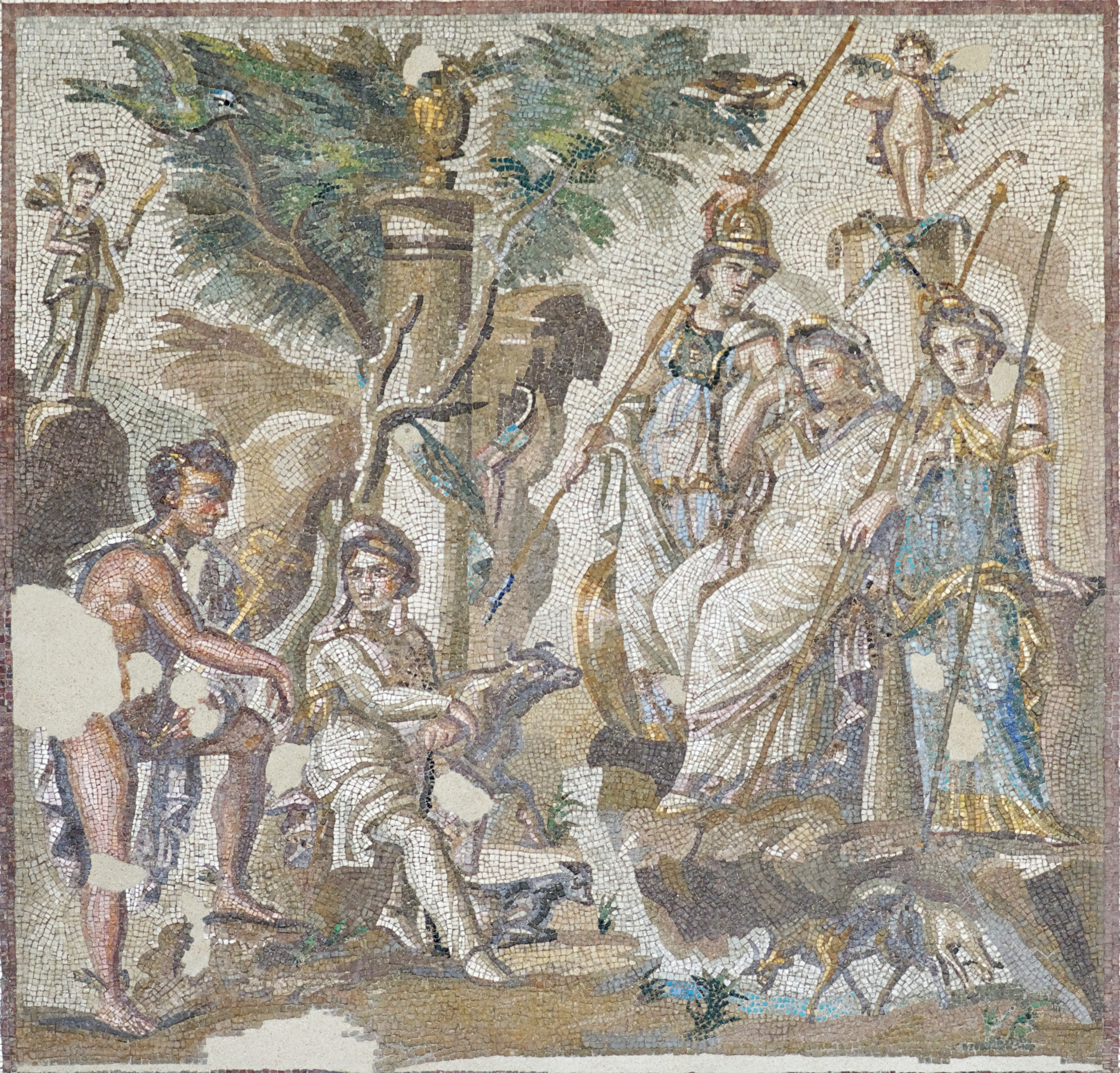
Ancient Greek mosaic from Antioch dating to the second century AD, depicting the Judgement of Paris

The myth of the Judgement of Paris is mentioned briefly in the Iliad, but is described in depth in an epitome of the Cypria, a lost poem of the Epic Cycle, which records that all the gods and goddesses as well as various mortals were invited to the marriage of Peleus and Thetis (the eventual parents of Achilles). Only Eris, goddess of discord, was not invited. She was annoyed at this, so she arrived with a golden apple inscribed with the word καλλίστῃ (kallistēi, "for the fairest"), which she threw among the goddesses. Aphrodite, Hera, and Athena all claimed to be the fairest, and thus the rightful owner of the apple. The goddesses chose to place the matter before Zeus, who, not wanting to favour one of the goddesses, put the choice into the hands of Paris, a Trojan prince. After bathing in the spring of Mount Ida where Troy was situated, the goddesses appeared before Paris for his decision. In the extant ancient depictions of the Judgement of Paris, Aphrodite is only occasionally represented nude, and Athena and Hera are always fully clothed. Since the Renaissance, however, Western paintings have typically portrayed all three goddesses as completely naked. All three goddesses were ideally beautiful and Paris could not decide between them, so they resorted to bribes. Hera tried to bribe Paris with power over all Asia and Europe, and Athena offered fame and glory in battle, but Aphrodite promised Paris that, if he were to choose her as the fairest, she would let him marry the most beautiful woman on earth. This woman was Helen, who was already married to King Menelaus of Sparta. Paris selected Aphrodite and awarded her the apple. The other two goddesses were enraged and, as a direct result, sided with the Greeks in the Trojan War.

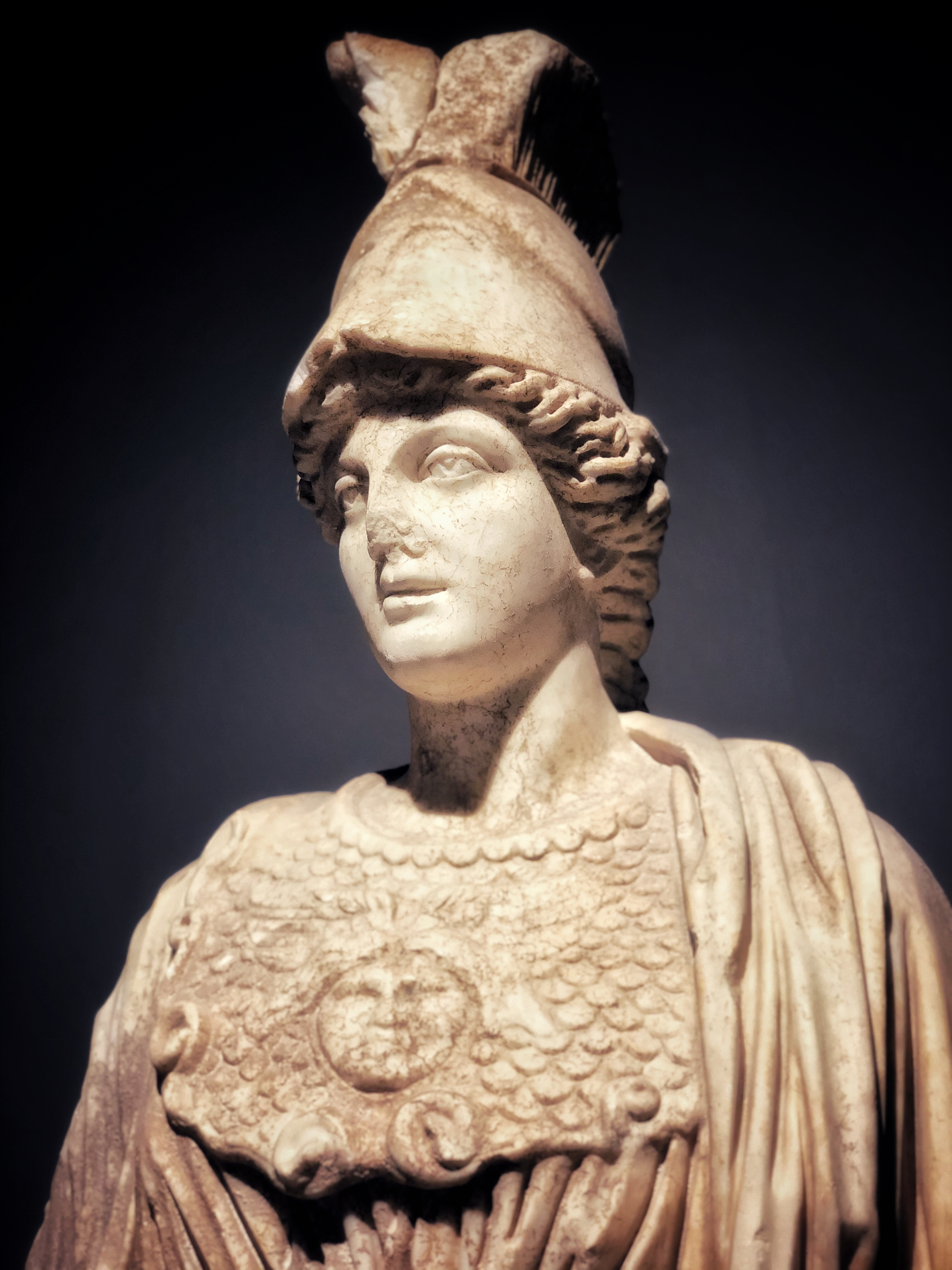
Athena statue in the Antalya Museum.

In Books V–VI of the Iliad, Athena aids the hero Diomedes, who, in the absence of Achilles, proves himself to be the most effective Greek warrior. Several artistic representations from the early sixth century BC may show Athena and Diomedes, including an early sixth-century BC shield band depicting Athena and an unidentified warrior riding on a chariot, a vase painting of a warrior with his charioteer facing Athena, and an inscribed clay plaque showing Diomedes and Athena riding in a chariot. Numerous passages in the Iliad also mention Athena having previously served as the patron of Diomedes's father Tydeus. When the Trojans go to her temple on the Acropolis to plead her for protection from Diomedes, Athena ignores them. Later, when Zeus allows the gods to fight, Ares, who sided with the Trojans, attacks Athena, but she overpowers him by striking him with a boulder.

In Book XXII of the Iliad, while Achilles is chasing Hector around the walls of Troy, Athena appears to Hector disguised as his brother Deiphobus and persuades him to hold his ground so that they can fight Achilles together. Then, Hector throws his spear at Achilles and misses, expecting Deiphobus to hand him another, but Athena disappears instead, leaving Hector to face Achilles alone without his spear. In Sophocles's tragedy Ajax, she punishes Odysseus's rival Ajax the Great, driving him insane and causing him to massacre the Achaeans' cattle, thinking that he is slaughtering the Achaeans themselves. Even after Odysseus himself expresses pity for Ajax, Athena declares, "To laugh at your enemies – what sweeter laughter can there be than that?" (lines 78–9). Ajax later commits suicide as a result of his humiliation.

Despite having supported the Achaeans since onset of the war, Athena's wrath turned against them after they sacked the city of Troy. Arctinus' Iliupersis concludes with the goddess plotting their destruction at sea as they sail away. In the Nostoi and Odyssey, she is said to cause a quarrel between brothers Agamemnon and Menelaus over whether they should sacrifice to the gods or return home immediately. The Greek fleet is wrecked by storms sent by Zeus and Poseidon on Athena's behalf. In the Posthomerica, Zeus gives Athena his lightning bolts to use against the ships.

Homer does not specify exactly what caused Athena's rage, only that the army was "not all prudent or just." Timothy Gantz suggests this could refer only to Ajax the Lesser's violation of Cassandra by Athena's statue, or to a general lack of respect during the sacking. In other sources, like Euripides and Quintus Smyrnaeus, she places all blame on Ajax the Lesser's crime and how the Achaeans did not punish him.

== Classical art ==
Athena appears frequently in classical Greek art, including on coins and in paintings on ceramics. She is especially prominent in works produced in Athens. In classical depictions, Athena is usually portrayed standing upright, wearing a full-length chiton. She is most often represented dressed in armour like a male soldier and wearing a Corinthian helmet raised high atop her forehead. Her shield bears at its centre the aegis with the head of the gorgon (gorgoneion) in the centre and snakes around the edge. Sometimes she is shown wearing the aegis as a cloak. As Athena Promachos, she is shown brandishing a spear. Scenes in which Athena was represented include her birth from the head of Zeus, her battle with the Gigantes, the birth of Erichthonius, and the Judgement of Paris.

The Mourning Athena or Athena Meditating is a famous relief sculpture dating to around 470–460 BC that has been interpreted to represent Athena Polias. The most famous classical depiction of Athena was the Athena Parthenos, a now-lost 11.5 m (38 ft) gold and ivory statue of her in the Parthenon created by the Athenian sculptor Phidias. Copies reveal that this statue depicted Athena holding her shield in her left hand with Nike, the winged goddess of victory, standing in her right. Athena Polias is also represented in a Neo-Attic relief now held in the Virginia Museum of Fine Arts, which depicts her holding an owl in her hand (Note: The owl's role as a symbol of wisdom originates in this association with Athena.) and wearing her characteristic Corinthian helmet while resting her shield against a nearby herma. The Roman goddess Minerva adopted most of Athena's Greek iconographical associations, but was also integrated into the Capitoline Triad.

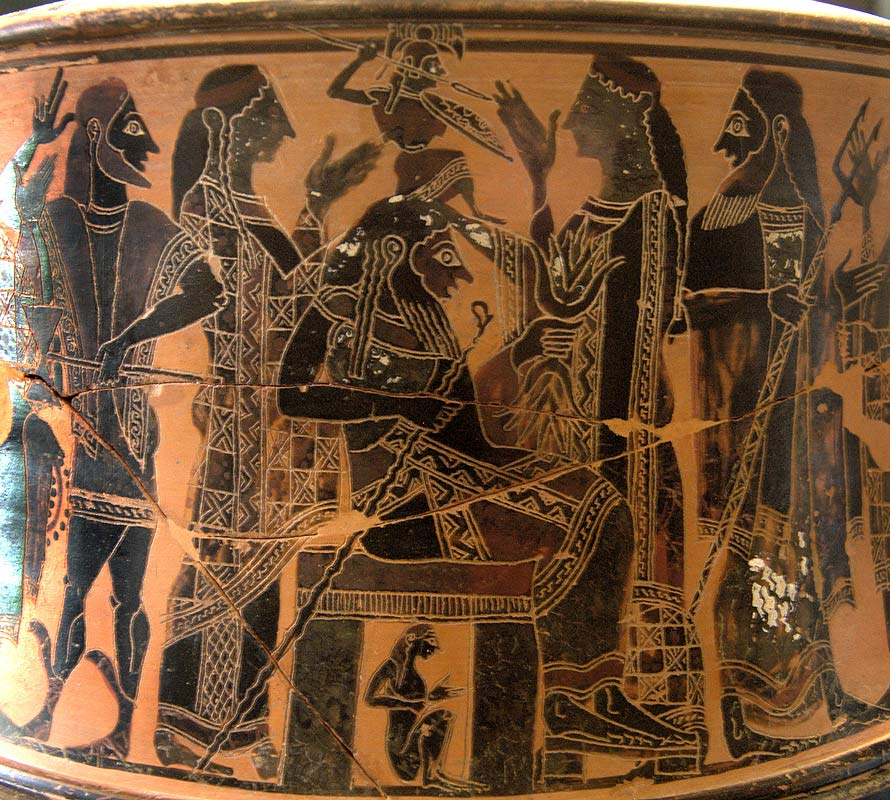
Attic black-figure exaleiptron of the birth of Athena from the head of Zeus (c. 570–560 BC) by the C Painter

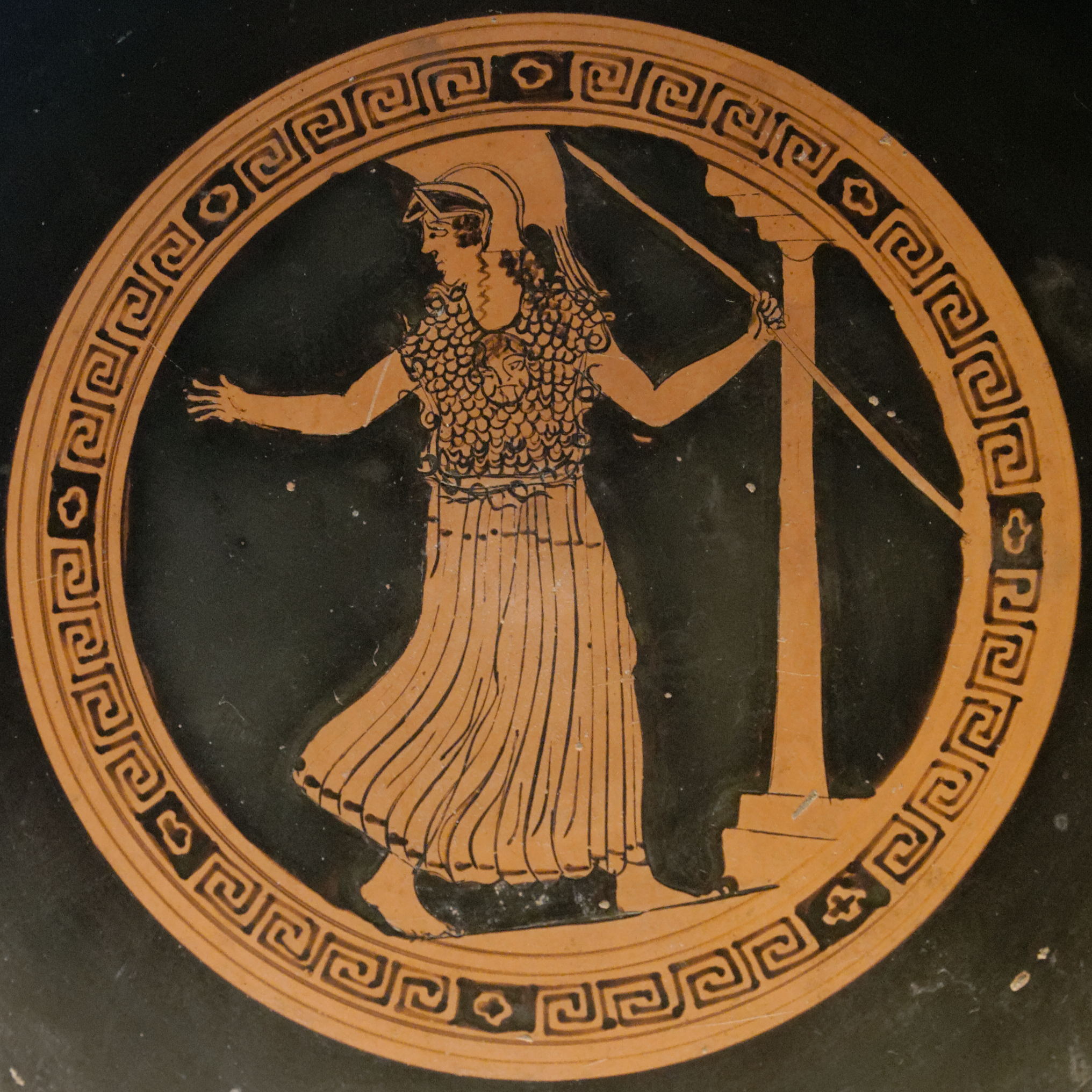
Attic red-figure kylix of Athena Promachos holding a spear and standing beside a Doric column (c. 500-490 BC)

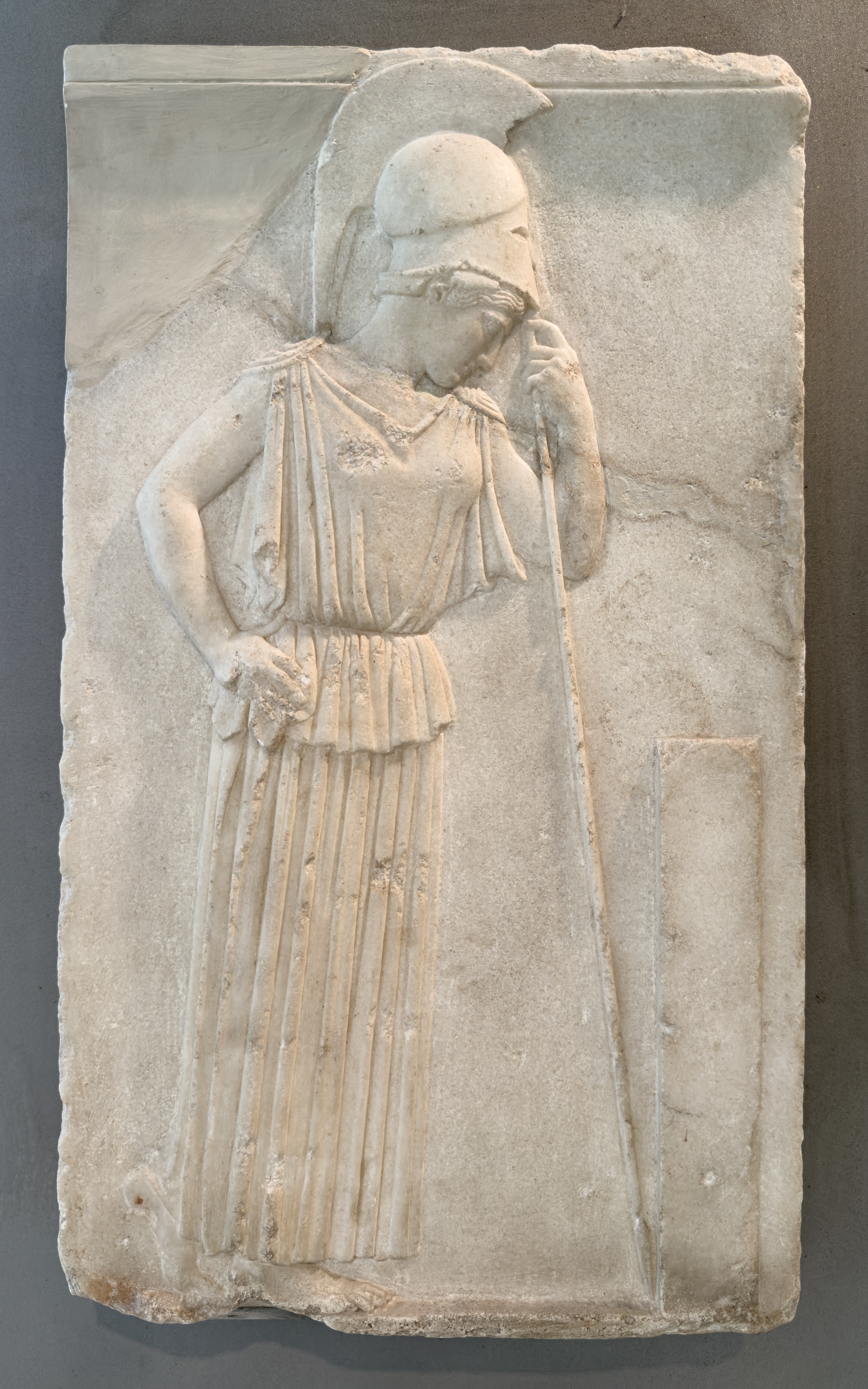
The Mourning Athena relief (c. 470-460 BC)

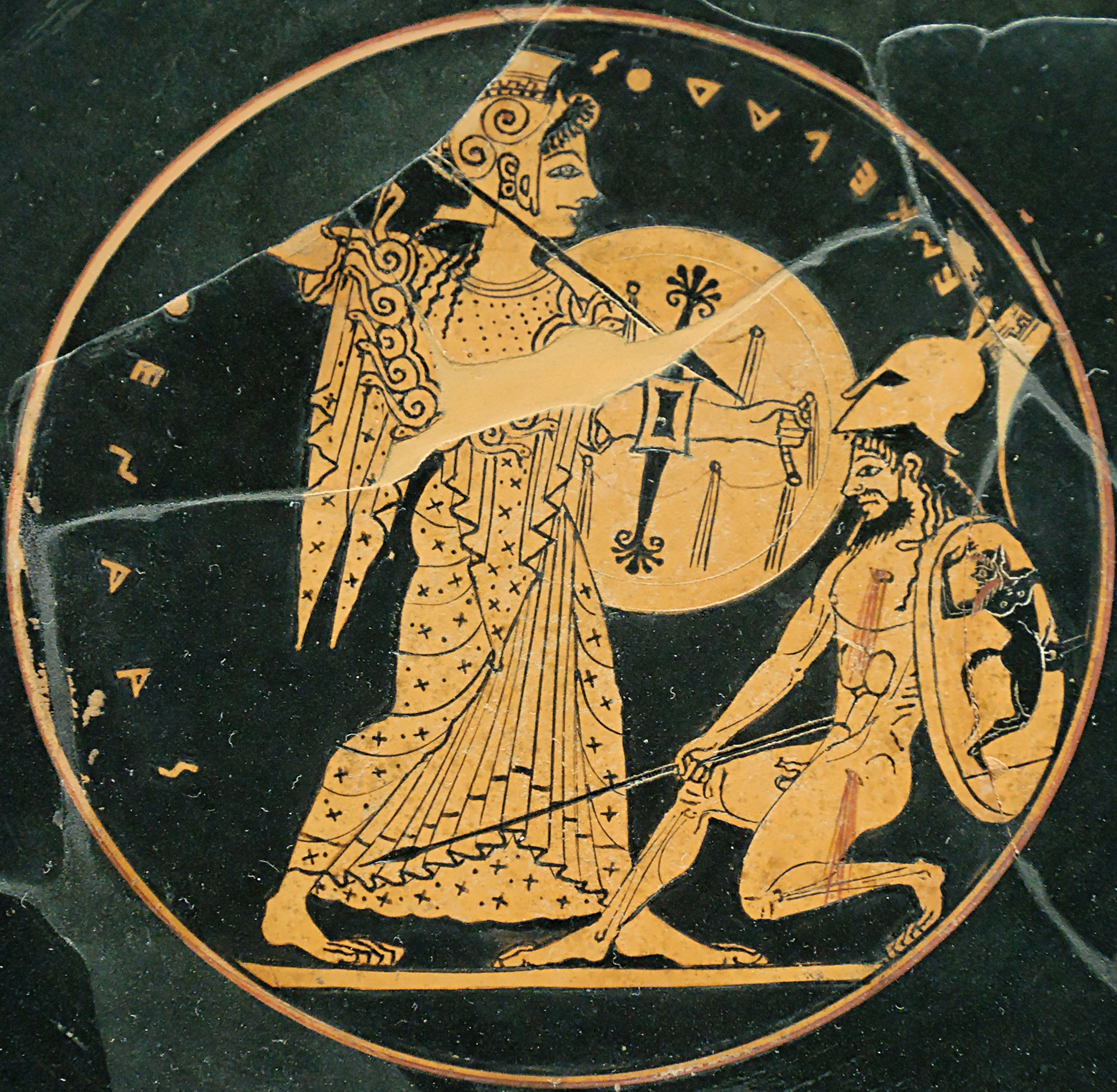
Attic red-figure kylix showing Athena slaying the Giant Enceladus (c. 550–500 BC). In the myth, she crushed Enceladus under the island of Sicily

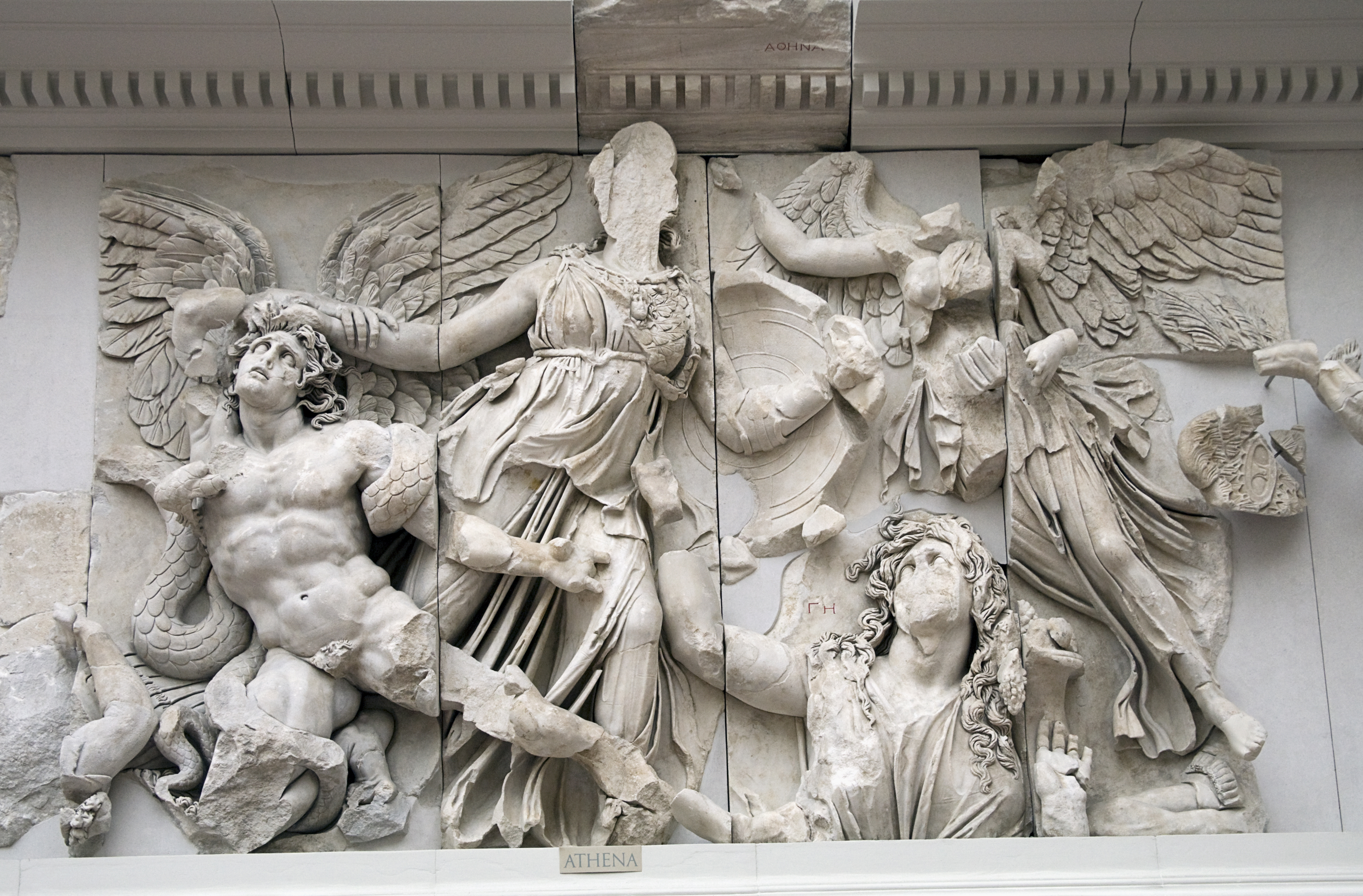
Relief of Athena and Nike slaying the Giant Alkyoneus (?) from the Gigantomachy Frieze on the Pergamon Altar (early second century BC)

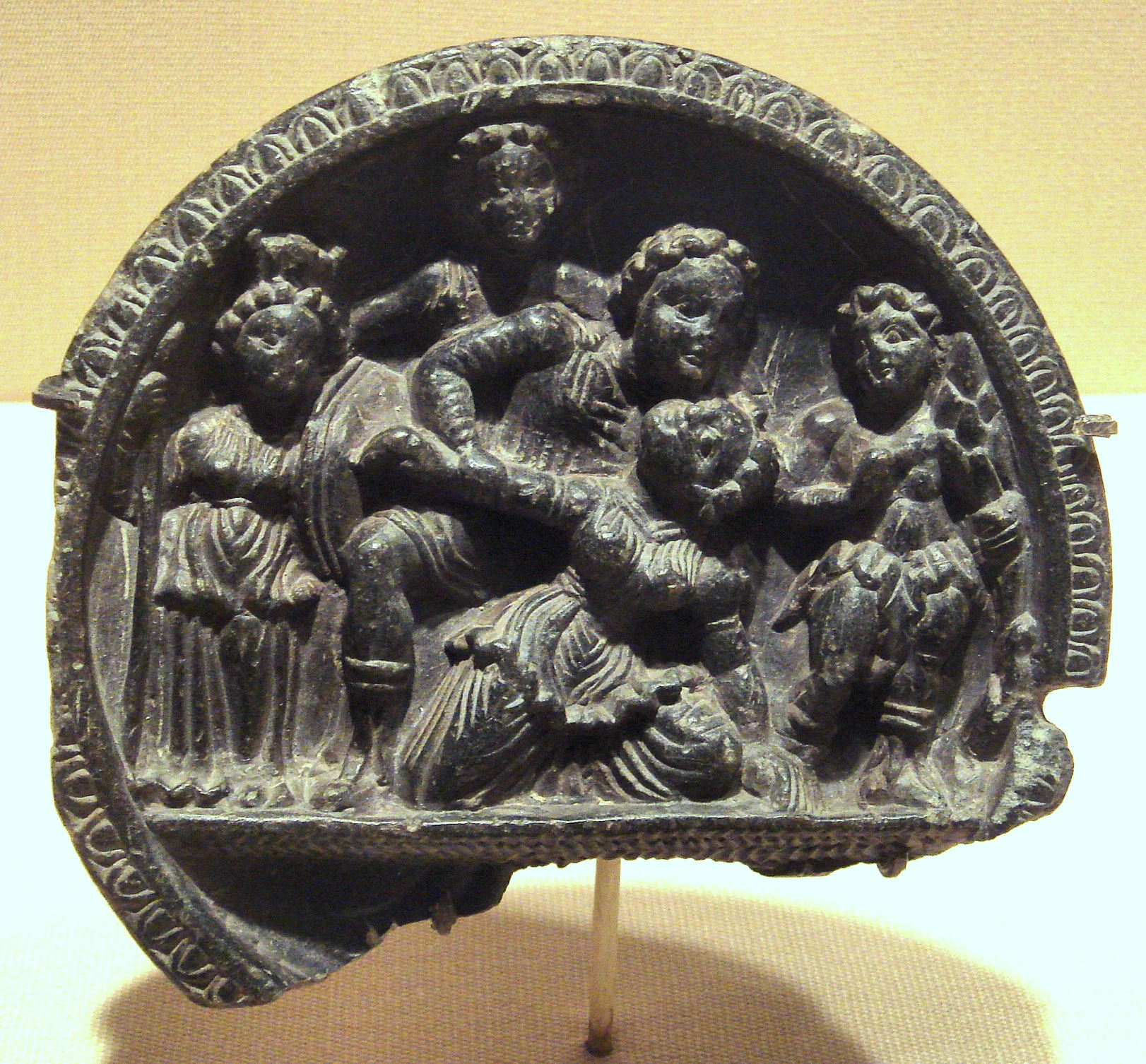
Mythological scene with Athena (left) and Heracles (right), on a stone palette of the Greco-Buddhist art of Gandhara, India

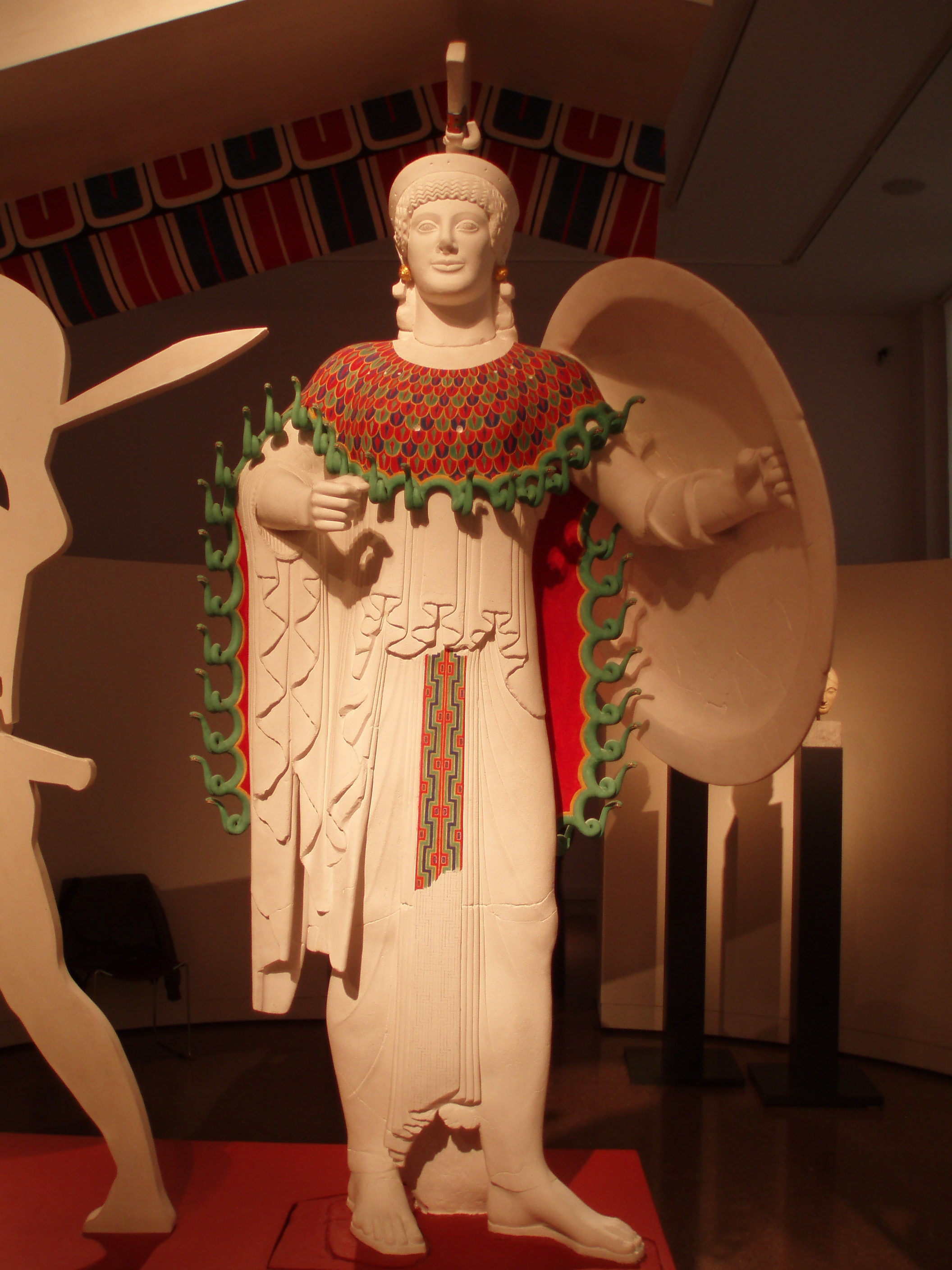
Restoration of the polychrome decoration of the Athena statue from the Aphaea temple at Aegina, c. 490 BC (from the exposition "Bunte Götter" by the Munich Glyptothek)

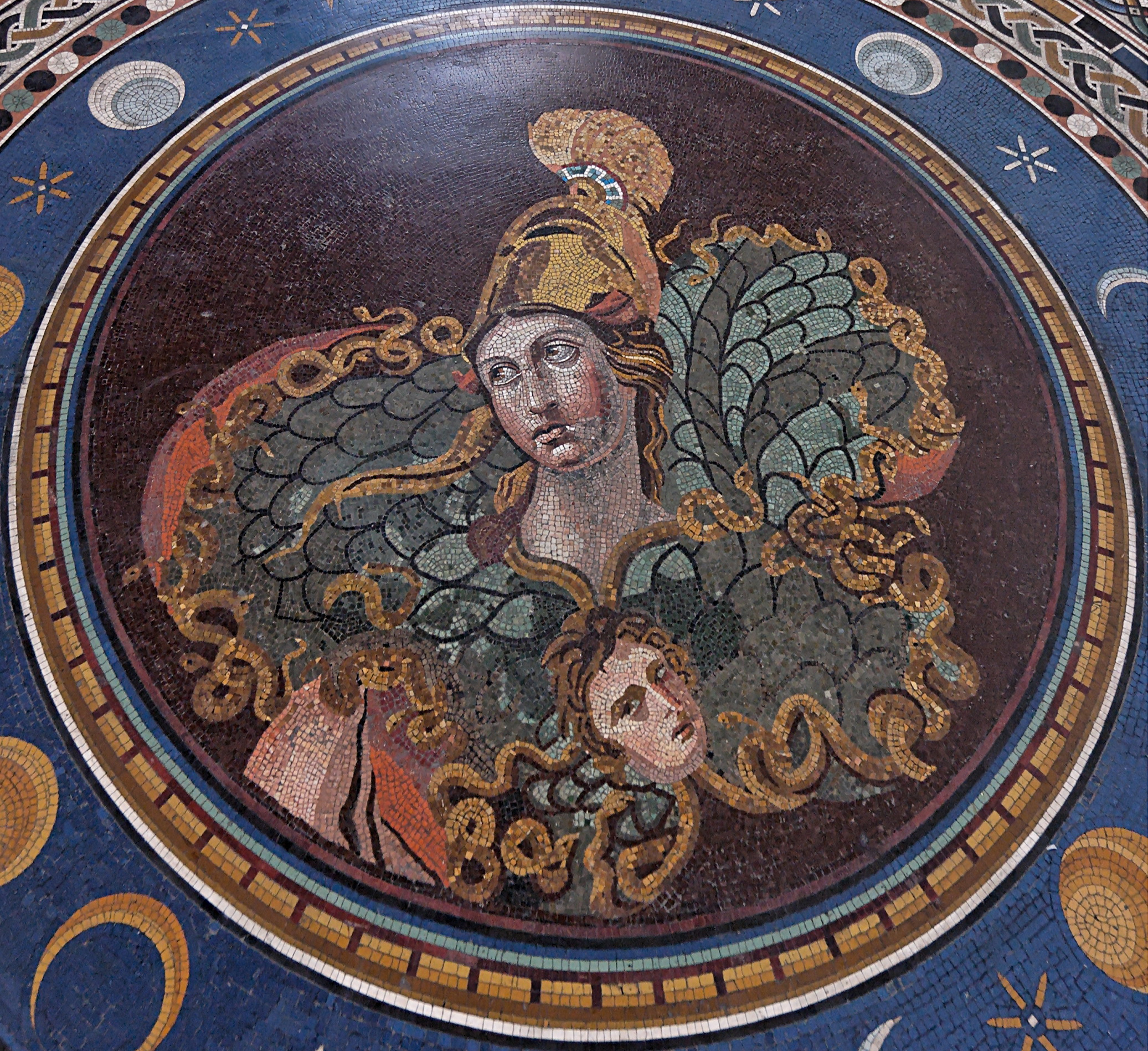
Classical mosaic from a villa at Tusculum, 3rd century AD, now at Museo Pio-Clementino, Vatican

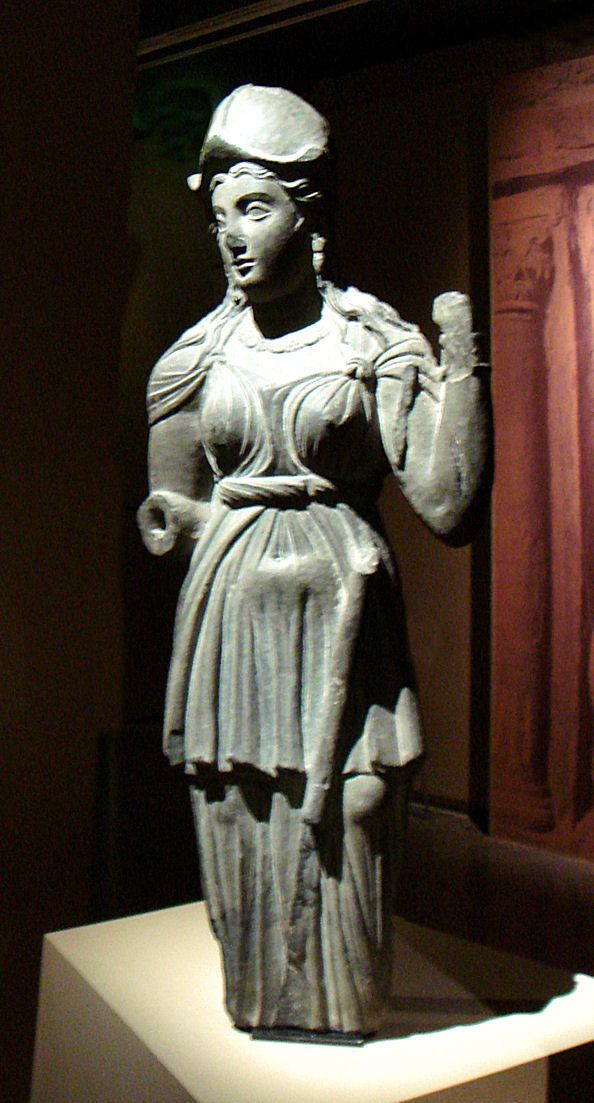
Athena (2nd century BC) in the art of Gandhara, displayed at the Lahore Museum, Pakistan

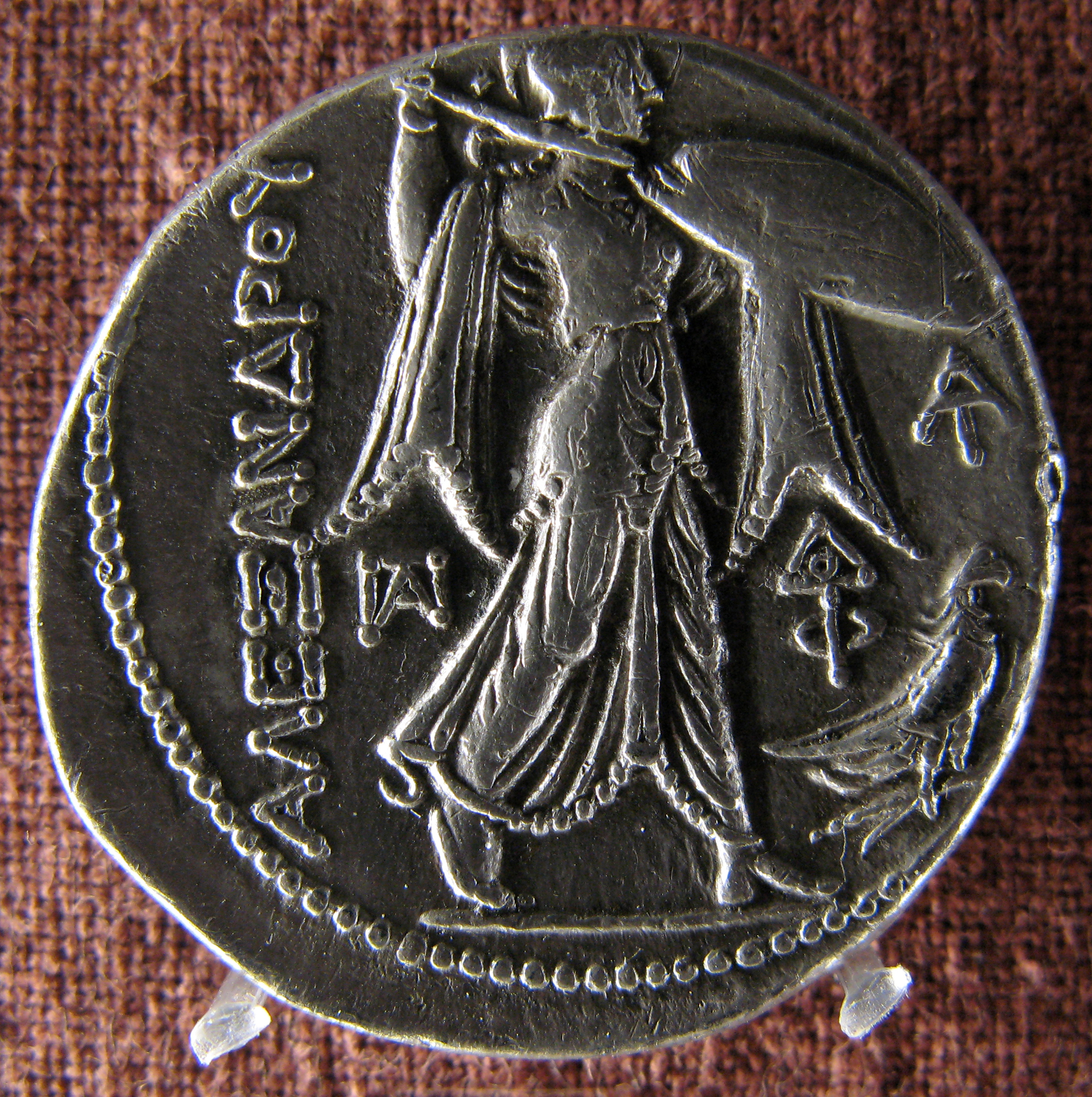
Athena Alkidemos, i.e. "Athena, defender of the people", on a coin of Ptolemy I Soter, under the name of Alexander the Great; minted c. 310–305 BC

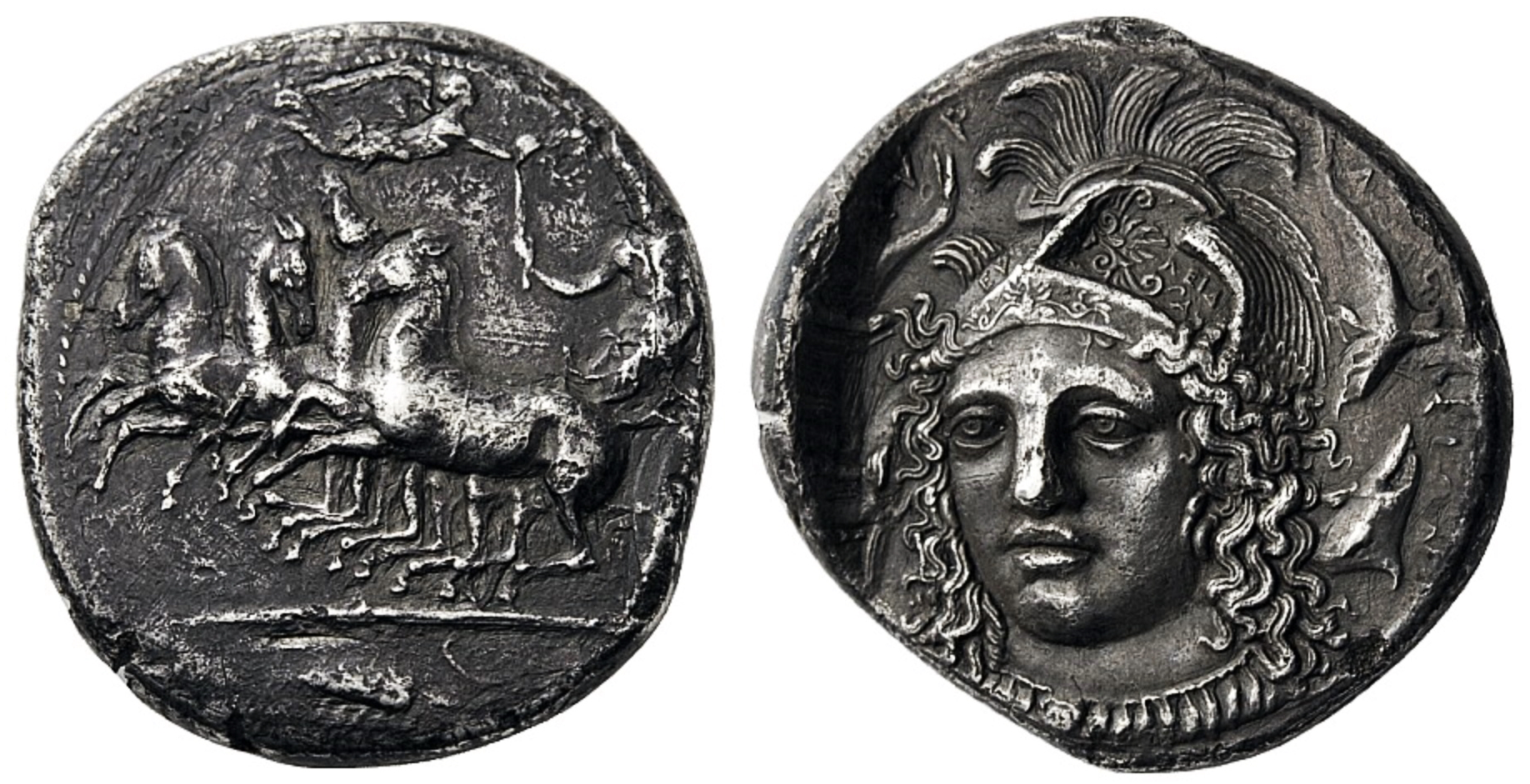
Athena portrait by Eukleidas on a tetradrachm from Syracuse, Sicily c. 400 BC

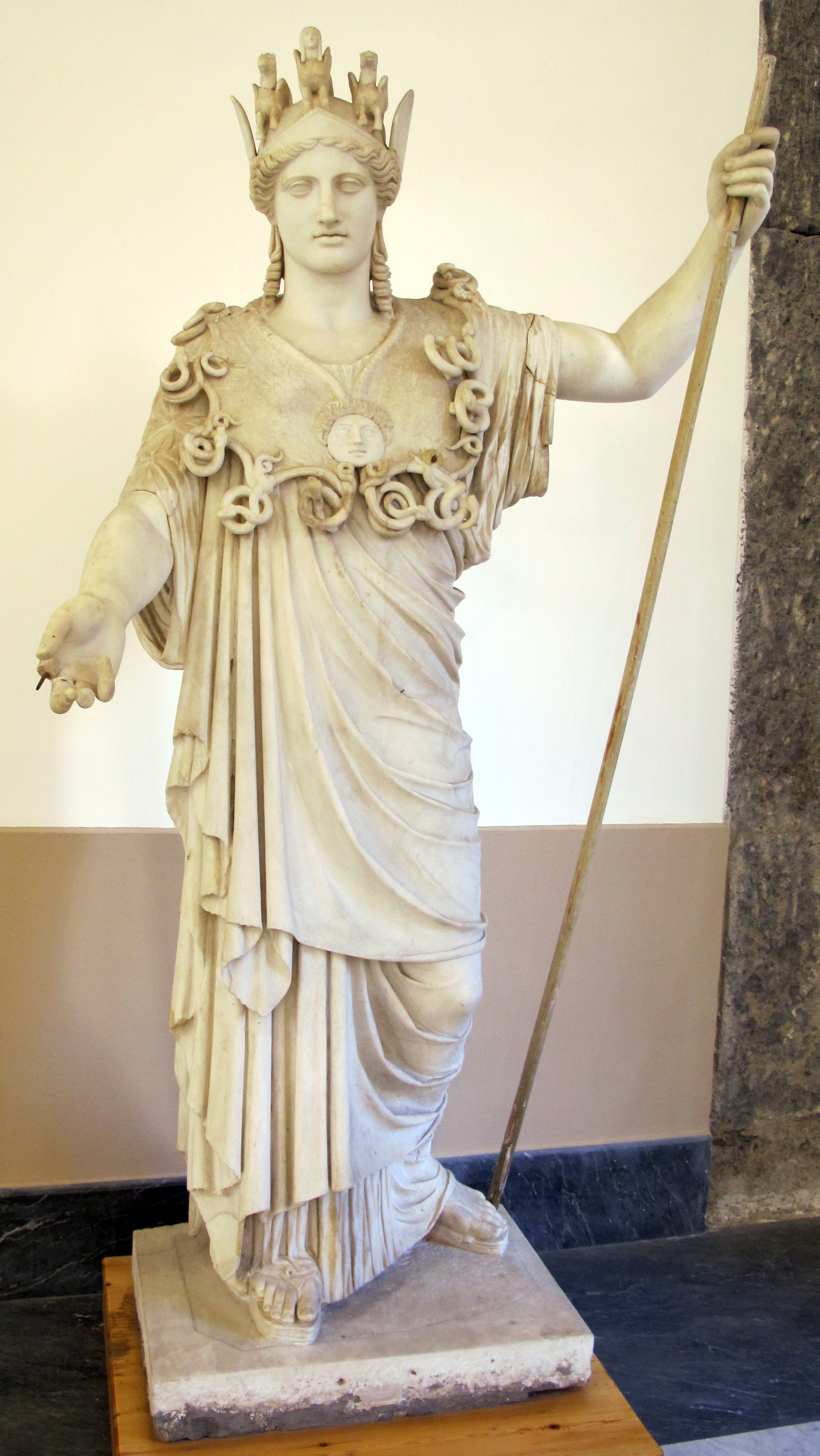
Atena farnese, Roman copy of a Greek original from Phidias' circle, c. 430 AD, Museo Archeologico, Naples

== Post-classical culture ==
=== Art and symbolism ===
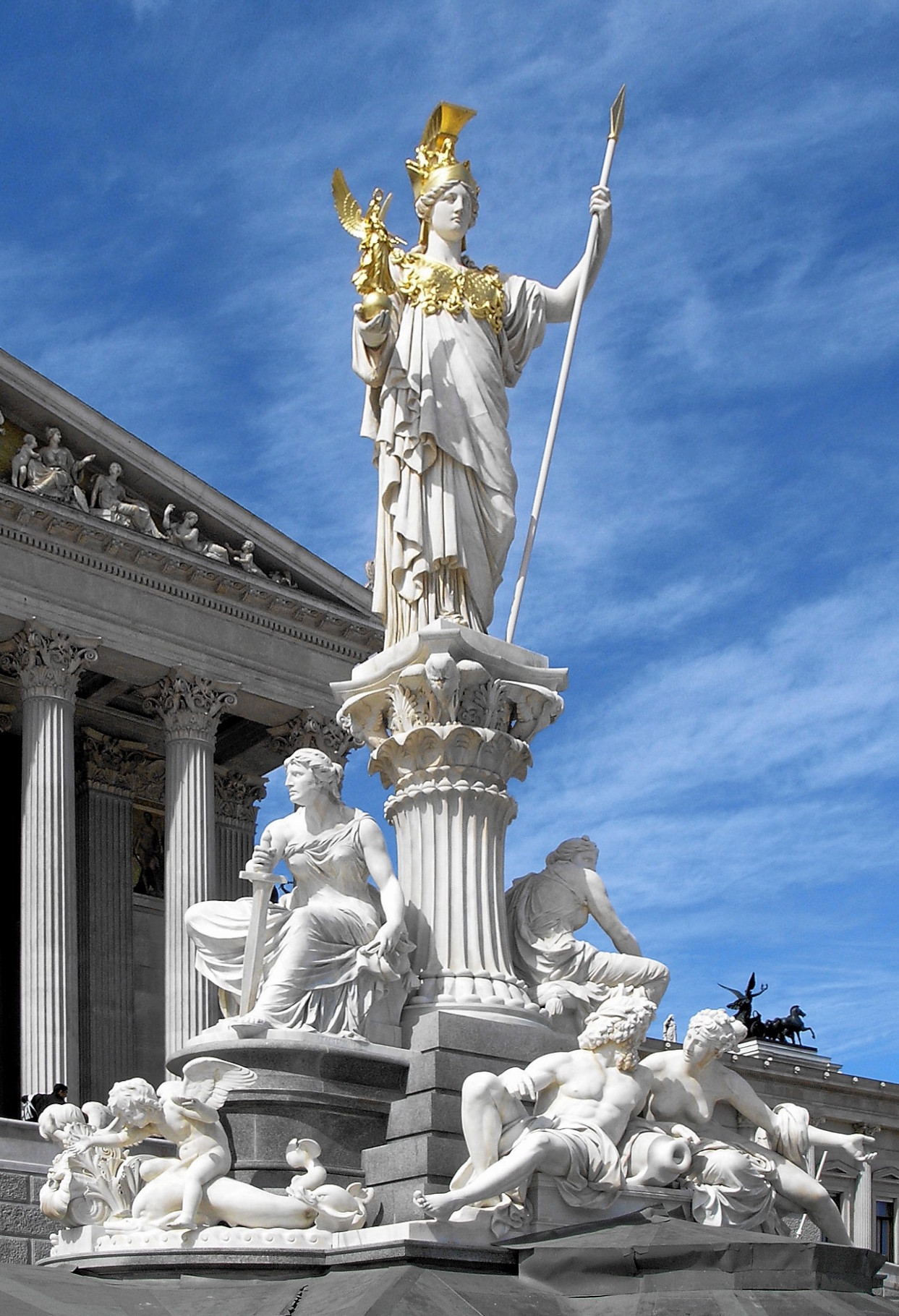
Statue of Pallas Athena in front of the Austrian Parliament Building. Athena has been used throughout Western history as a symbol of freedom and democracy.

Early Christian writers, such as Clement of Alexandria and Firmicus, denigrated Athena as representative of all the things that were detestable about paganism; they condemned her as "immodest and immoral". During the Middle Ages, however, many attributes of Athena were given to the Virgin Mary, mother of Jesus, who, in fourth-century portrayals, was often depicted wearing the gorgoneion. Some even viewed the Virgin Mary as a warrior maiden, much like Athena Parthenos; one anecdote tells that the Virgin Mary once appeared upon the walls of Constantinople when it was under siege by the Avars, clutching a spear and urging the people to fight. During the Middle Ages, Athena became widely used as a Christian symbol and allegory, and she appeared on the family crests of certain noble houses.

During the Renaissance, Athena donned the mantle of patron of the arts and human endeavour; allegorical paintings involving Athena were a favourite of the Italian Renaissance painters. In Sandro Botticelli's painting Pallas and the Centaur, probably painted sometime in the 1480s, Athena is the personification of chastity, who is shown grasping the forelock of a centaur, who represents lust. Andrea Mantegna's 1502 painting Minerva Expelling the Vices from the Garden of Virtue uses Athena as the personification of Graeco-Roman learning chasing the vices of medievalism from the garden of modern scholarship. Athena is also used as the personification of wisdom in Bartholomeus Spranger's 1591 painting The Triumph of Wisdom or Minerva Victorious over Ignorance.

During the sixteenth and seventeenth centuries, Athena was used as a symbol for female rulers. In his book A Revelation of the True Minerva (1582), Thomas Blennerhassett portrays Queen Elizabeth I of England as a "new Minerva" and "the greatest goddesse nowe on earth". A series of paintings by Peter Paul Rubens depict Athena as Marie de' Medici's patron and mentor; the final painting in the series goes even further and shows Marie de' Medici with Athena's iconography, as the mortal incarnation of the goddess herself. The Flemish sculptor Jean-Pierre-Antoine Tassaert (Jan Peter Anton Tassaert) later portrayed Empress Catherine the Great of Russia as Athena in a marble bust in 1774. During the French Revolution, statues of pagan gods were torn down all throughout France, but statues of Athena were not. Instead, Athena was transformed into the personification of freedom and the republic and a statue of the goddess stood in the centre of the Place de la Revolution in Paris. In the years following the Revolution, artistic representations of Athena proliferated.

A statue of Athena stands directly in front of the Austrian Parliament Building in Vienna, and depictions of Athena have influenced other symbols of Western freedom, including the Statue of Liberty and Britannia. For over a century, a full-scale replica of the Parthenon has stood in Nashville, Tennessee. In 1990, the curators added a gilded forty-two-foot (12.5 m) tall replica of Phidias's Athena Parthenos, built from concrete and fiberglass. The Great Seal of California bears the image of Athena kneeling next to a brown grizzly bear. Athena has occasionally appeared on modern coins, as she did on the ancient Athenian drachma. Her head appears on the $50 1915-S Panama-Pacific commemorative coin.

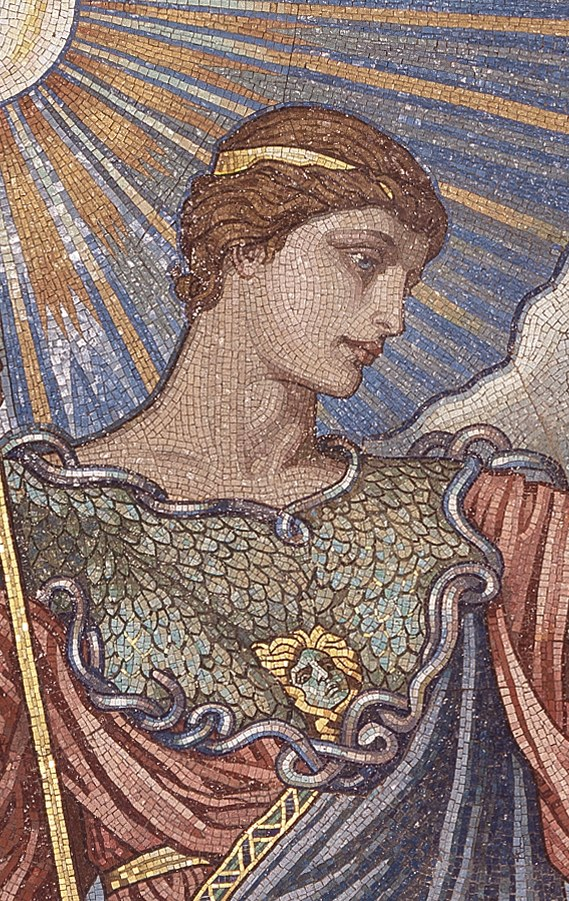
Minerva of Peace mosaic in the Library of Congress

Athena column at the Academy of Athens

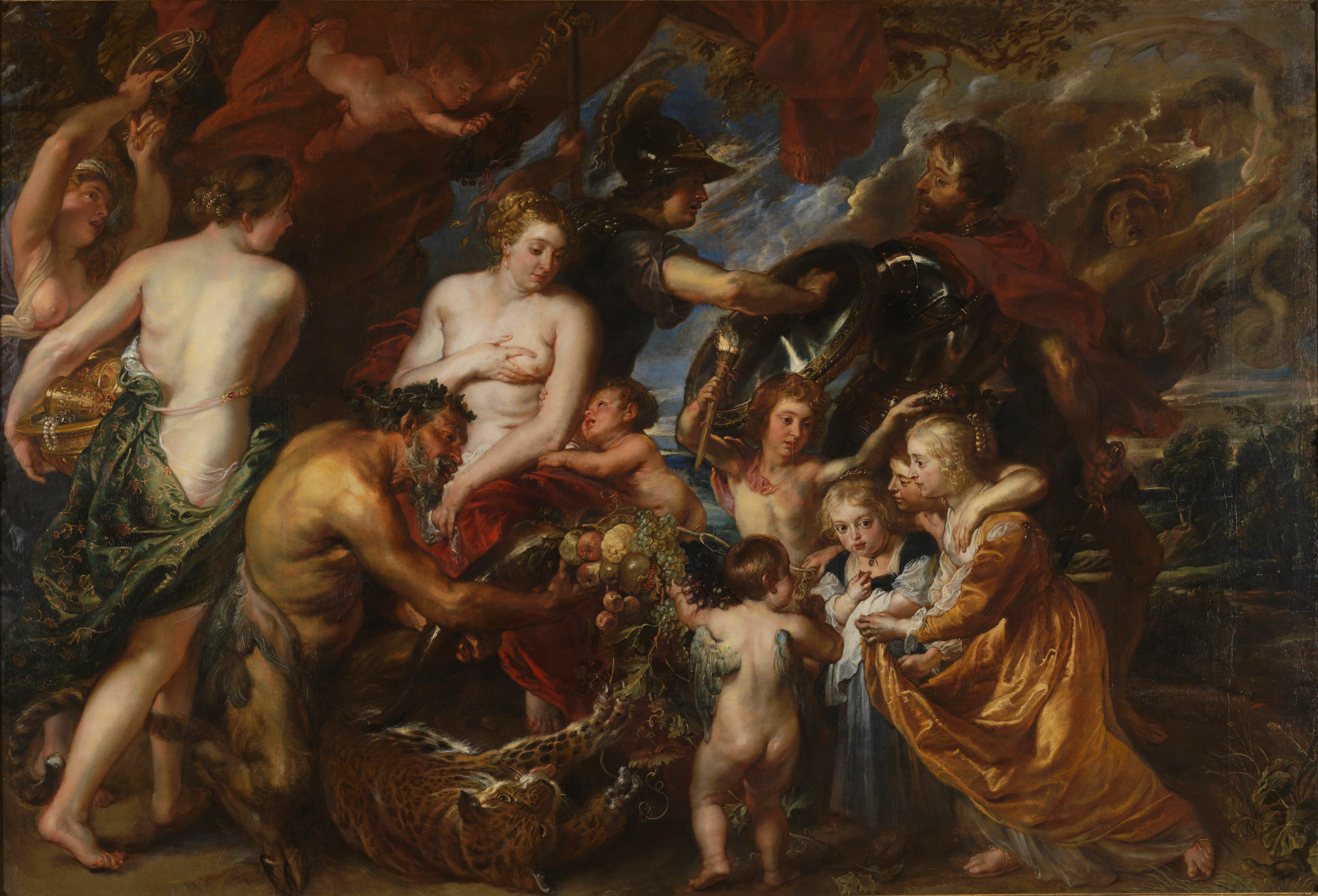
Minerva Protecting Peace from Mars (1629) by Peter Paul Rubens

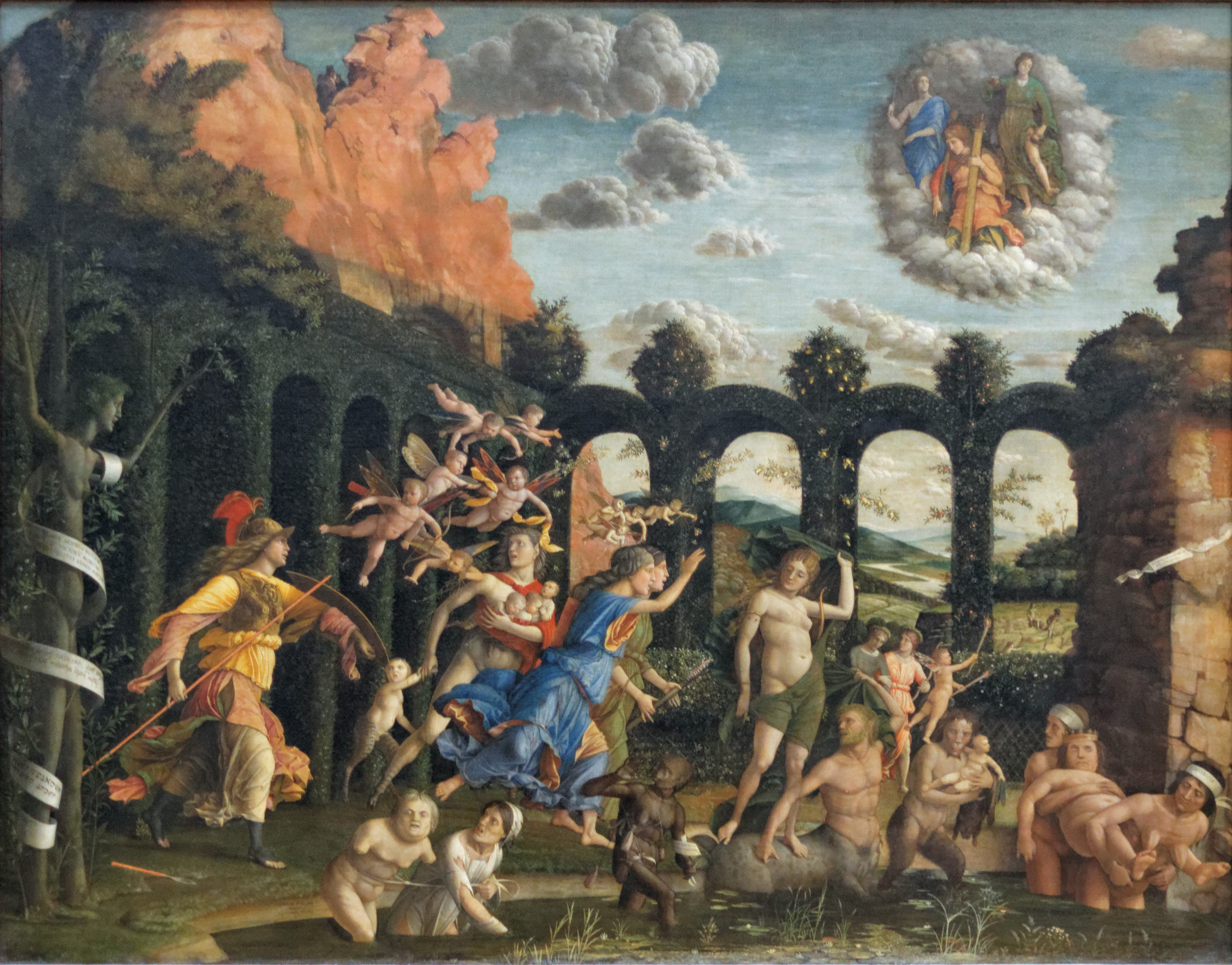
Minerva Expelling the Vices from the Garden of Virtue (1502) by Andrea Mantegna

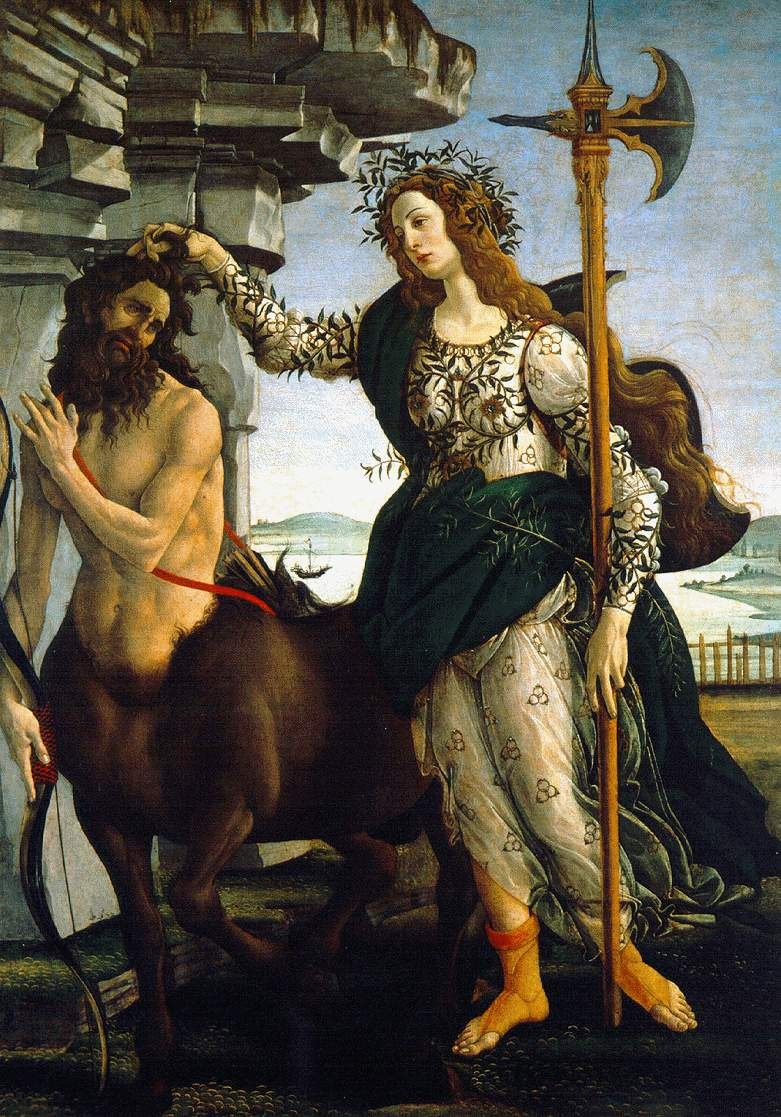
Pallas and the Centaur (c. 1482) by Sandro Botticelli

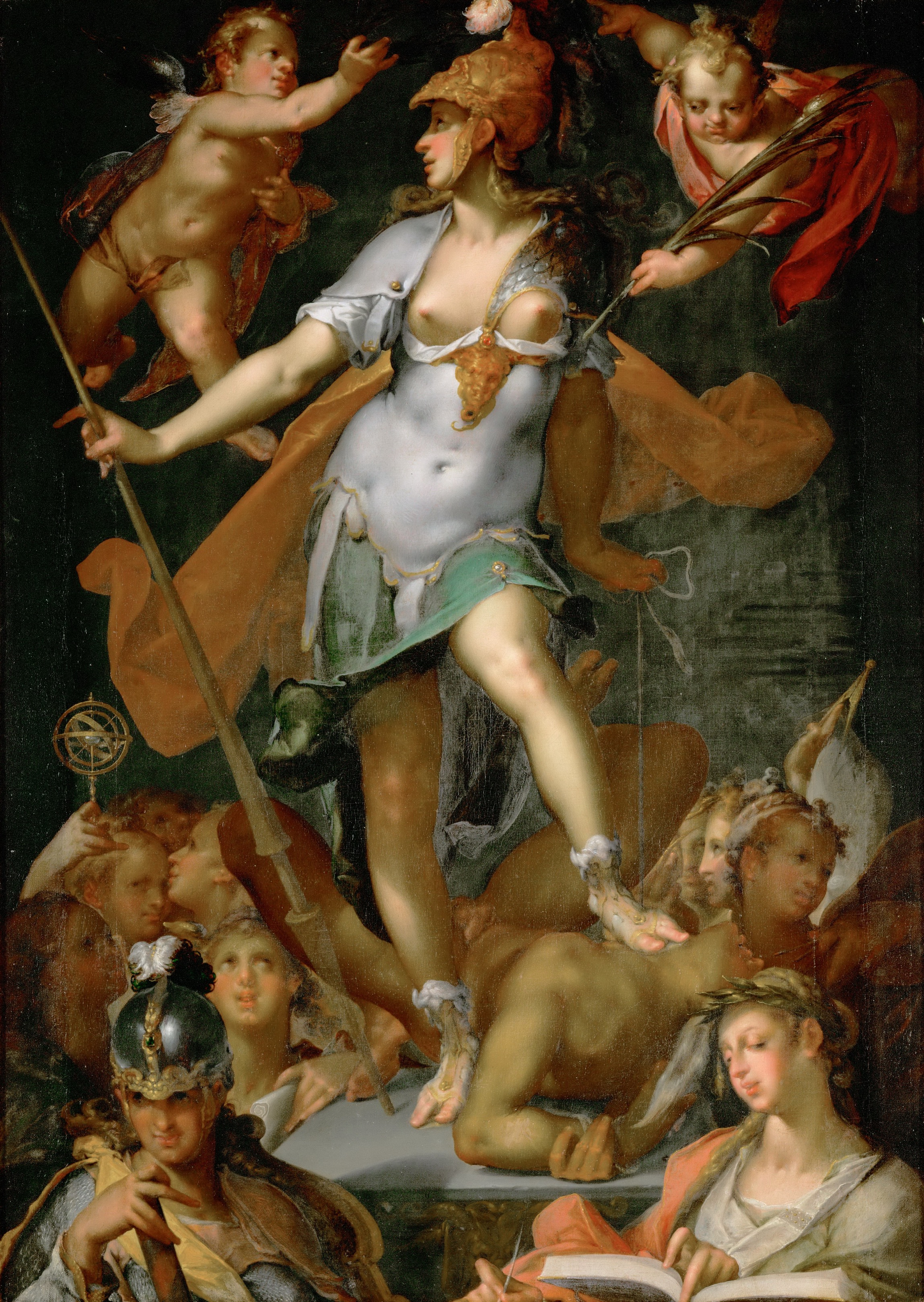
Minerva Victorious over Ignorance (c. 1591) by Bartholomeus Spranger

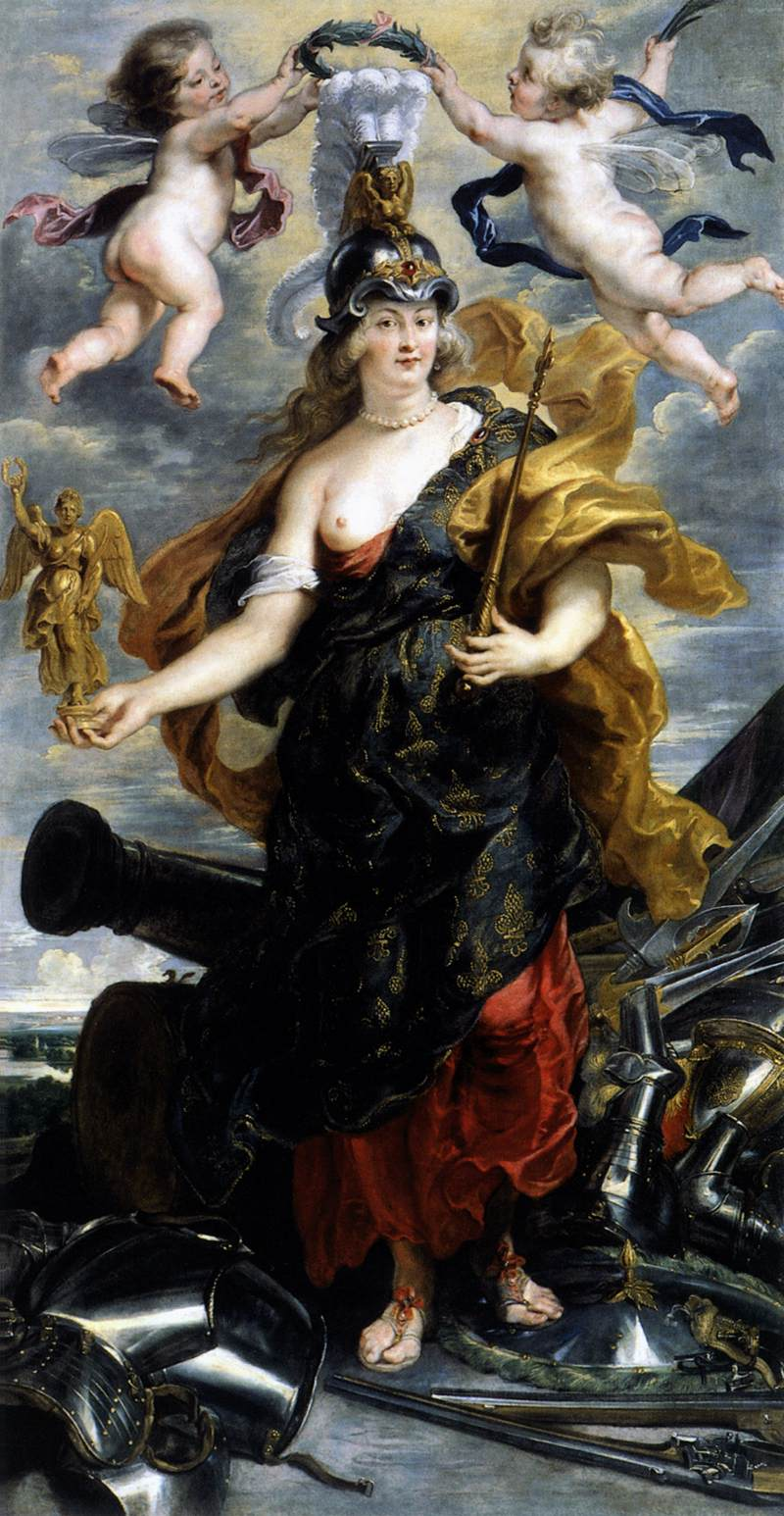
Maria de Medici (1622) by Peter Paul Rubens, showing her as the incarnation of Athena

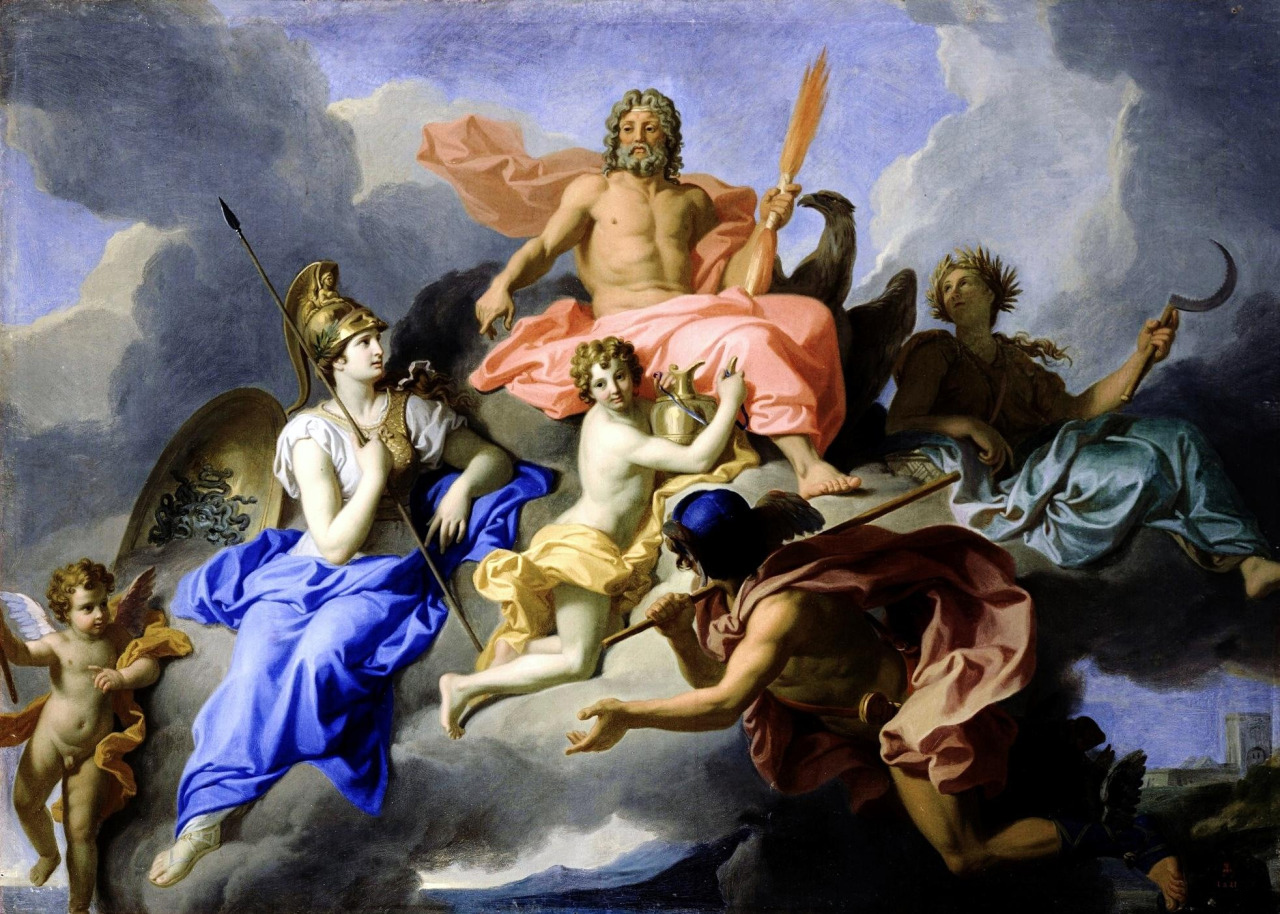
Minerva and the Triumph of Jupiter (1706) by René-Antoine Houasse

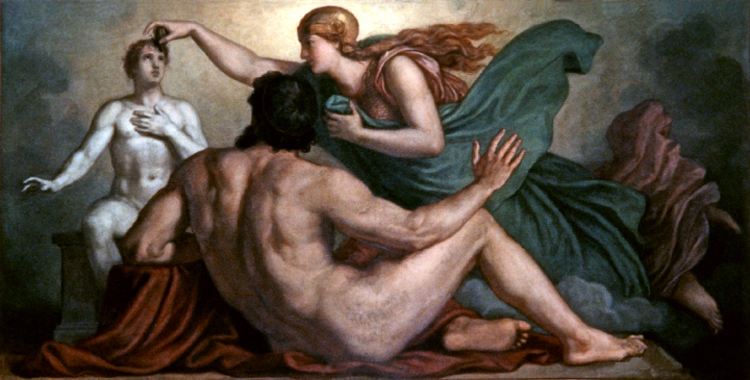
Prometheus watches Athena endow his creation with reason (painting by Christian Griepenkerl, 1877).

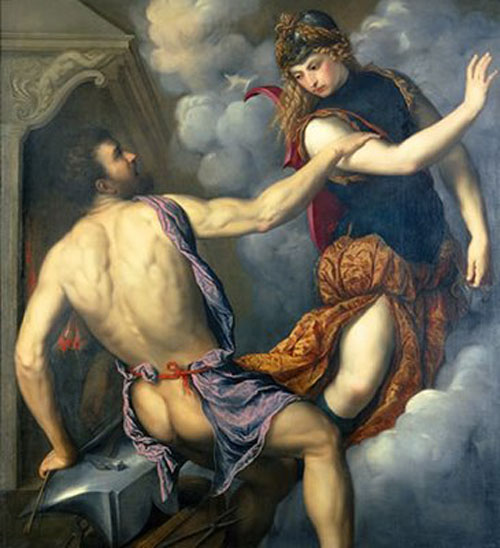
Athena Scorning the Advances of Hephaestus (c. 1555–1560) by Paris Bordone

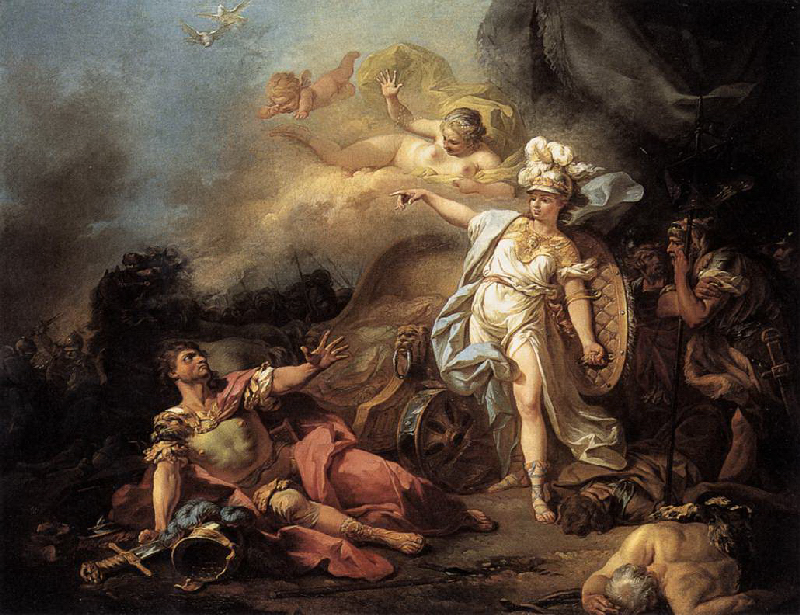
Minerva Fighting Mars (1771) by Jacques-Louis David

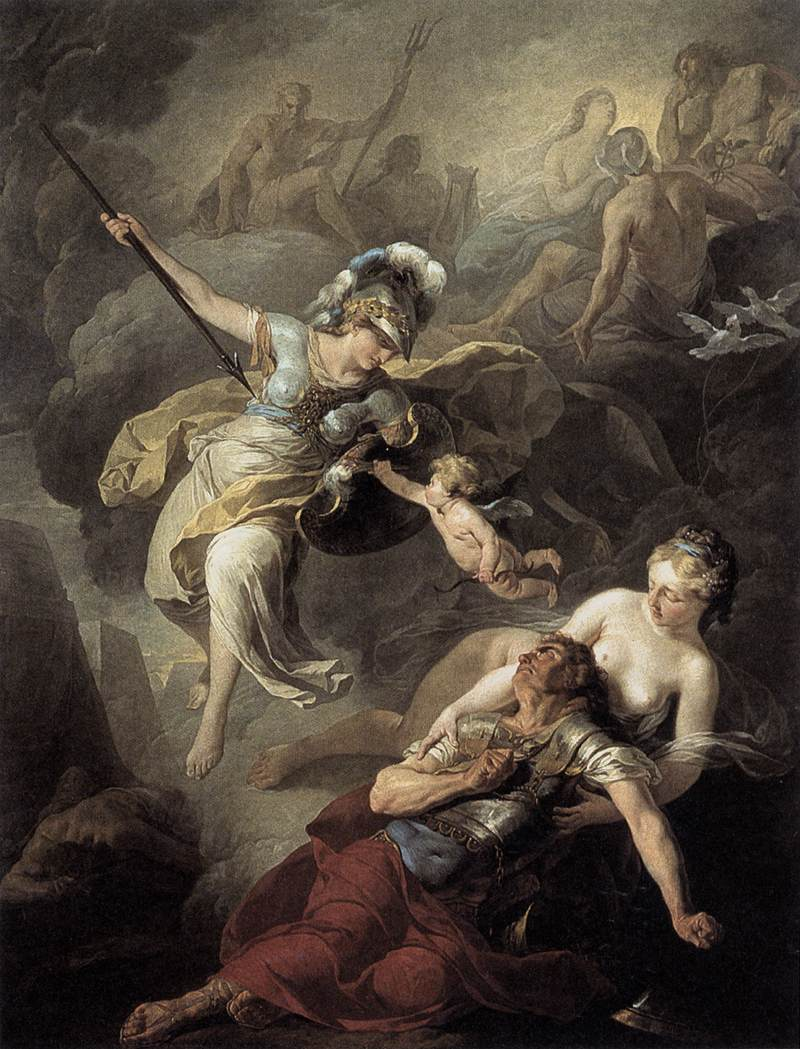
The Combat of Mars and Minerva (1771) by Joseph-Benoît Suvée

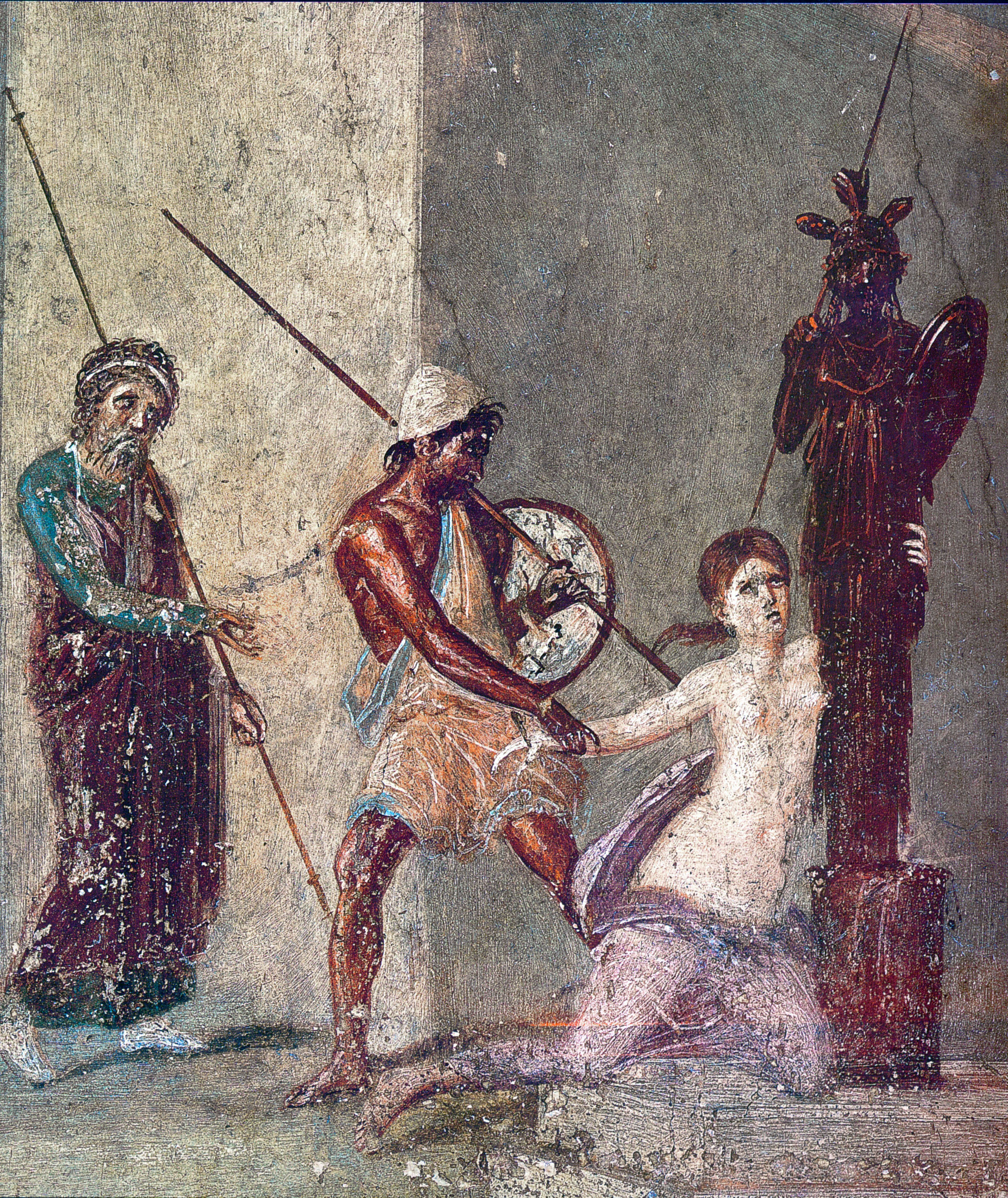
Pompeii's Roman fresco shows Ajax dragging Cassandra away from palladium in the fall of Troy, event that provoked Athena's wrath to Greek armies

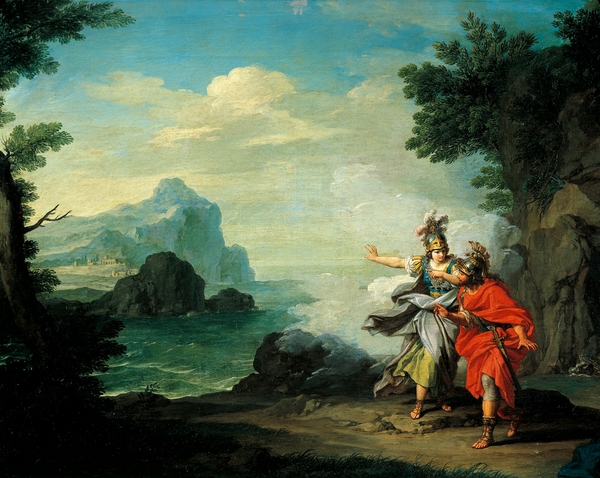
Minerva Revealing Ithaca to Ulysses (fifteenth century) by Giuseppe Bottani

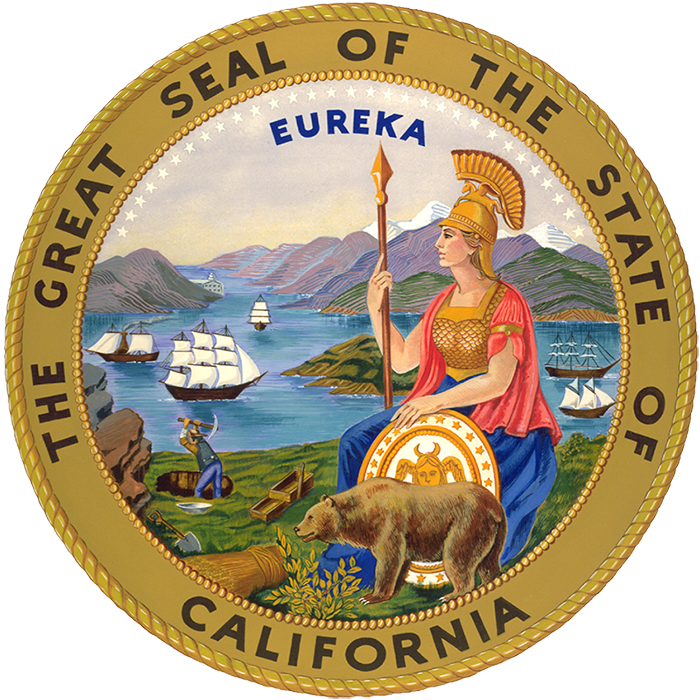
Athena on the Great Seal of California

=== Modern interpretations ===
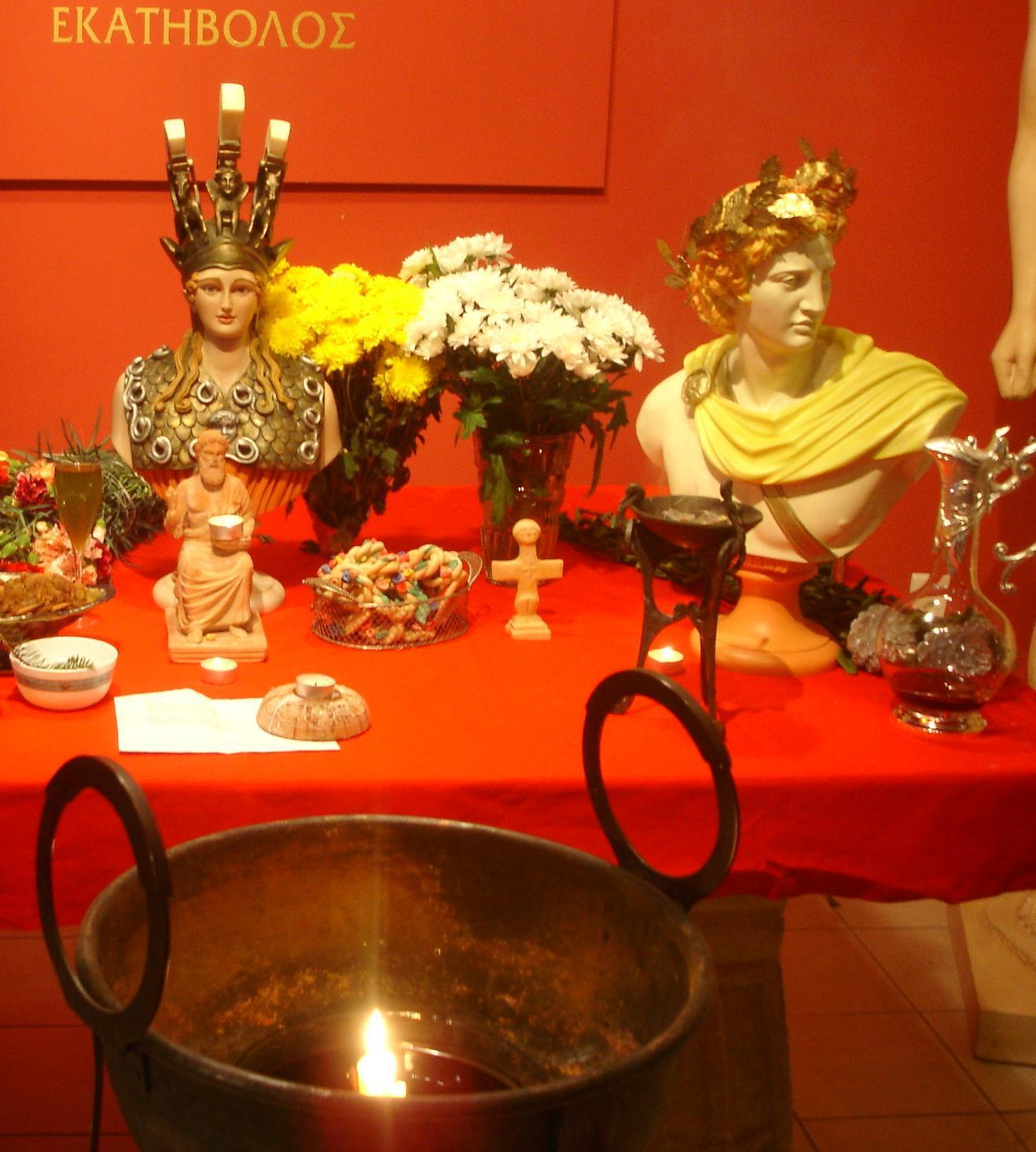
Modern Neopagan Hellenist altar dedicated to Athena and Apollo

One of Sigmund Freud's most treasured possessions was a small, bronze sculpture of Athena, which sat on his desk. Freud once described Athena as "a woman who is unapproachable and repels all sexual desires – since she displays the terrifying genitals of the Mother". Feminist views on Athena are sharply divided; some regard her as "the ultimate patriarchal sell out ... who uses her powers to promote and advance men rather than others of her sex", while some feminists regard her as a symbol of female empowerment, In contemporary Wicca, Athena is venerated as an aspect of the Goddess and some Wiccans believe that she may bestow the "Owl Gift" ("the ability to write and communicate clearly") upon her worshippers. Due to her status as one of the twelve Olympians, Athena is a major deity in Hellenismos, a Neopagan religion which seeks to authentically revive and recreate the religion of ancient Greece in the modern world.

Athena is a natural patron of universities: At Bryn Mawr College in Pennsylvania, a statue of Athena (a replica of the original bronze one in the arts and archaeology library) resides in the Great Hall. It is traditional at exam time for students to leave offerings to the goddess with a note asking for good luck, or to repent for accidentally breaking any of the college's numerous other traditions. Pallas Athena is the tutelary goddess of the international social fraternity Phi Delta Theta. Her owl is also a symbol of the fraternity.

== Genealogy ==
Athena's family tree

Uranus	Gaia
Uranus' genitals	Oceanus	Tethys	Cronus	Rhea
Metis	Zeus	Hera	Poseidon	Hades	Demeter	Hestia
ATHENA	(Note: According to Homer, Iliad 1.570–579, 14.338, Odyssey 8.312, Hephaestus was apparently the son of Hera and Zeus, see Gantz, p. 74.)
b (Note: According to Hesiod, Theogony 927–929, Hephaestus was produced by Hera alone, with no father, see Gantz, p. 74.)
Ares	Hephaestus
Leto
Apollo	Artemis
Maia
Hermes
Semele
Dionysus
Dione
a (Note: According to Hesiod, Theogony 183–200, Aphrodite was born from Uranus' severed genitals, see Gantz, pp. 99–100.)	b (Note: According to Homer, Aphrodite was the daughter of Zeus (Iliad 3.374, 20.105; Odyssey 8.308, 320) and Dione (Iliad 5.370–71), see Gantz, pp. 99–100.)
Aphrodite

== See also ==
- Athenaeum (disambiguation)
- Ambulia, a Spartan epithet used for Athena, Zeus, and Castor and Pollux

== Bibliography ==
=== Ancient sources ===
- Apollodorus, Library, 3,180
- Augustine, De civitate dei xviii.8–9
- Cicero, De natura deorum iii.21.53, 23.59
- Eusebius, Chronicon 30.21–26, 42.11–14
- Homer, The Iliad with an English Translation by A.T. Murray, PhD in two volumes. Cambridge, Massachusetts., Harvard University Press; London, William Heinemann, Ltd. 1924. Online version at the Perseus Digital Library Archived 15 April 2021 at the Wayback Machine.
- Homer; The Odyssey with an English Translation by A.T. Murray, PH.D. in two volumes. Cambridge, Massachusetts., Harvard University Press; London, William Heinemann, Ltd. 1919. Online version at the Perseus Digital Library Archived 29 October 2021 at the Wayback Machine.
- Hesiod, Theogony, in The Homeric Hymns and Homerica with an English Translation by Hugh G. Evelyn-White, Cambridge, Massachusetts., Harvard University Press; London, William Heinemann Ltd. 1914. Online version at the Perseus Digital Library Archived 17 November 2021 at the Wayback Machine.
- Lactantius, Divinae institutions i.17.12–13, 18.22–23
- Livy, Ab urbe condita libri vii.3.7
- Lucan, Bellum civile ix.350

=== Modern sources ===
- Aghion, Irène; Barbillon, Claire; Lissarrague, François (1996), "Minerva", Gods and Heroes of Classical Antiquity, Flammarion Infographic Guides, Paris, France and New York City, New York: Flammarion, pp. 192–194, ISBN 978-2-0801-3580-3
- Alexander, Timothy Jay (2007), The Gods of Reason: An Authentic Theology for Modern Hellenismos (First ed.), Lulu Press, Inc., ISBN 978-1-4303-2763-9
- Apollodorus of Athens (13 February 2016). The Library of Apollodorus (Delphi Classics). UK: Delphi Classics. ISBN 9781786563712.
- Beekes, Robert S. P. (2009), Etymological Dictionary of Greek, Leiden and Boston: Brill
- Bell, Robert E. (1993), Women of Classical Mythology: A Biographical Dictionary, Oxford, England: Oxford University Press, ISBN 9780195079777
- Bernal, Martin (1987), Black Athena: The Afroasiatic Roots of Classical Civilization, New Brunswick: Rutgers University Press, pp. 21, 51 ff
- Berlinerblau, Jacques (1999), Heresy in the University: The Black Athena Controversy and the Responsibilities of American Intellectuals, New Brunswick: Rutgers University Press, p. 93ff, ISBN 9780813525884
- Best, Jan (1989), Fred Woudhuizen (ed.), Lost Languages from the Mediterranean, Leiden, Germany et al.: Brill, p. 30, ISBN 978-9004089341
- Brown, Jane K. (2007), The Persistence of Allegory: Drama and Neoclassicism from Shakespeare to Wagner, Philadelphia, Pennsylvania: University of Penssylvania Press, ISBN 978-0-8122-3966-9
- Bull, Malcolm (2005), The Mirror of the Gods: How Renaissance Artists Rediscovered the Pagan Gods, Oxford, England: Oxford University Press, ISBN 978-0-19-521923-4
- Burgess, Jonathan S. (2001), The Tradition of the Trojan War in Homer and the Epic Cycle, Baltimore, Maryland: The Johns Hopkins University Press, ISBN 978-0-8018-6652-4
- Burkert, Walter (1985), Greek Religion, Cambridge, Massachusetts: Harvard University Press, ISBN 978-0-674-36281-9
- Burn, Lucilla (2004), Hellenistic Art: From Alexander the Great to Augustus, London, England: The British Museum Press, ISBN 978-0-89236-776-4
- Chadwick, John (1976), The Mycenaean World, Cambridge, England: Cambridge University Press, ISBN 978-0-521-29037-1
- Darmon, Jean-Pierre (1992), Wendy Doniger (ed.), The Powers of War: Athena and Ares in Greek Mythology, translated by Danielle Beauvais, Chicago, Illinois: University of Chicago Press
- Deacy, Susan; Villing, Alexandra (2001), Athena in the Classical World, Leiden, The Netherlands: Koninklijke Brill NV, ISBN 978-9004121423
- Deacy, Susan (2008), Athena, London and New York: Routledge, ISBN 978-0-415-30066-7
- de Jong, Irene J. F. (2001), A Narratological Commentary on the Odyssey, Cambridge, England: Cambridge University Press, ISBN 978-0-521-46844-2
- Edmunds, Lowell (1990), Approaches to Greek Myth, Baltimore, Maryland: The Johns Hopkins University Press, ISBN 978-0-8018-3864-4
- Friedman, Sarah (2005), Bryn Mawr College Off the Record, College Prowler, ISBN 978-1-59658-018-3
- Fritze, Ronald H. (2009), Invented Knowledge: False History, Fake Science and Pseudo-Religions, London, England: Reaktion Books, ISBN 978-1-86189-430-4
- Fururmark, A. (1978), "The Thera Catastrophe-Consequences for the European Civilization", Thera and the Aegean World I, London, England: Cambridge University Press
- Gantz, Timothy (1996), Early Greek Myth: A Guide to Literary and Artistic Sources, Johns Hopkins University Press In two volumes: ISBN 978-0-8018-5360-9 (Vol. 1), ISBN 978-0-8018-5362-3 (Vol. 2).
- Gallagher, Ann-Marie (2005), The Wicca Bible: The Definitive Guide to Magic and the Craft, New York City, New York: Sterling Publishing Co., Inc., ISBN 978-1-4027-3008-5
- Garland, Robert (2008), Ancient Greece: Everyday Life in the Birthplace of Western Civilization, New York City, New York: Sterling, ISBN 978-1-4549-0908-8
- Goldhill, S. (1986), Reading Greek Tragedy (Aesch.Eum.737), Cambridge, England: Cambridge University Press
- Graves, Robert (1960) [1955], The Greek Myths, London, England: Penguin, ISBN 978-0241952740
- Hansen, William F. (2004), "Athena (also Athenê and Athenaia) (Roman Minerva)", Classical Mythology: A Guide to the Mythical World of the Greeks and Romans, Oxford, England: Oxford University Press, pp. 121–126, ISBN 978-0-19-530035-2
- Harries, Byron (1990), "The spinner and the poet: Arachne in Ovid's Metamorphoses", The Cambridge Classical Journal, 36, Cambridge, England: Cambridge University Press: 64–82, doi:10.1017/S006867350000523X, ISSN 0068-6735
- Harrison, Jane Ellen, 1903. Prolegomena to the Study of Greek Religion.
- Herrington, C.J. (1955), Athena Parthenos and Athena Polias, Manchester, England: Manchester University Press
- Hubbard, Thomas K. (1986), "Pegasus' Bridle and the Poetics of Pindar's Thirteenth Olympian", in Tarrant, R. J. (ed.), Harvard Studies in Classical Philology, vol. 90, Cambridge, Massachusetts: Harvard University Press, ISBN 978-0-674-37937-4
- Hurwit, Jeffrey M. (1999), The Athenian Acropolis: History, Mythology, and Archaeology from the Neolithic Era to the Present, Cambridge, England: Cambridge University Press, ISBN 978-0-521-41786-0
- Janda, Michael (2005), Elysion. Entstehung und Entwicklung der griechischen Religion, Innsbruck: Institut für Sprachen und Literaturen, ISBN 9783851247022
- Jasanoff, Jay H.; Nussbaum, Alan (1996), "Word games: the Linguistic Evidence in Black Athena" (PDF), in Mary R. Lefkowitz; Guy MacLean Rogers (eds.), Black Athena Revisited, The University of North Carolina Press, p. 194, ISBN 9780807845554, archived (PDF) from the original on 9 October 2022
- Jenkyns, Richard (2016), Classical Literature: An Epic Journey from Homer to Virgil and Beyond, New York City, New York: Basic Books, A Member of the Perseus Books Group, ISBN 978-0-465-09797-5
- Johrens, Gerhard (1981), Der Athenahymnus des Ailios Aristeides, Bonn, Germany: Habelt, pp. 438–452, ISBN 9783774918504
- Jost, Madeleine (1996), "Arcadian cults and myths", in Hornblower, Simon (ed.), Oxford Classical Dictionary, Oxford, England: Oxford University Press
- Kerényi, Karl (1951), The Gods of the Greeks, London, England: Thames and Hudson, ISBN 978-0-500-27048-6
- Kerényi, Karl (1952), Die Jungfrau und Mutter der griechischen Religion. Eine Studie uber Pallas Athene, Zurich: Rhein Verlag
- Kinsley, David (1989), The Goddesses' Mirror: Visions of the Divine from East and West, Albany, New York: New York State University Press, ISBN 978-0-88706-836-2
- Kugelmann, Robert (1983), The Windows of Soul: Psychological Physiology of the Human Eye and Primary Glaucoma, Plainsboro, New Jersey: Associated University Presses, ISBN 978-0-8387-5035-3
- Leach, Eleanor Winsor (January 1974), "Ekphrasis and the Theme of Artistic Failure in Ovid's Metamorphoses", Ramus, 3 (2), Cambridge, England: Cambridge University Press: 102–142, doi:10.1017/S0048671X00004549, S2CID 29668658
- Mallory, James P.; Adams, Douglas Q. (2006), Oxford Introduction to Proto-Indo-European and the Proto-Indo-European World, London: Oxford University Press, ISBN 978-0-19-929668-2
- Morford, Mark P. O.; Lenardon, Robert J. (1999), Classical Mythology (sixth ed.), Oxford, England: Oxford University Press, ISBN 978-0-19-514338-6
- Murrin, Michael (Spring 2007), "Athena and Telemachus", International Journal of the Classical Tradition, 13 (4), Berlin, Germany: Springer: 499–514, doi:10.1007/BF02923022, JSTOR 30222174, S2CID 170103084
- Mylonas, G. (1966), Mycenae and the Mycenaean Age, Princeton, New Jersey: Princeton University Press, ISBN 978-0691035239
- Nilsson, Martin Persson (1950), The Minoan-Mycenaean Religion and Its Survival in Greek Religion (second ed.), New York: Biblo & Tannen, ISBN 978-0-8196-0273-2
- Nilsson, Martin Persson (1967), Die Geschichte der griechischen Religion, München, Germany: C. F. Beck
- Norton, Elizabeth (2013), Aspects of Ecphrastic Technique in Ovid's Metamorphoses, Newcastle upon Tyne, England: Cambridge Scholars Publishing, ISBN 978-1-4438-4271-6
- Oldenburg, Ulf (1969), The Conflict Between El and Ba'al in Canaanite Religion, Leiden, The Netherlands: E. J. Brill
- Palagia, Olga; Pollitt, J. J. (1996), Personal Styles in Greek Sculpture, Cambridge, England: Cambridge University Press, ISBN 978-0-521-65738-9
- Palaima, Thomas (2004), "Appendix One: Linear B Sources", in Trzaskoma, Stephen (ed.), Anthology of Classical Myth: Primary Sources in Translation, Hackett
- Penglase, Charles (1994), Greek Myths and Mesopotamia: Parallels and Influence in the Homeric Hymns and Hesiod, New York City, New York: Routledge, ISBN 978-0-415-15706-3
- Phinney, Edward Jr. (1971), "Perseus' Battle with the Gorgons", Transactions and Proceedings of the American Philological Association, 102, Baltimore, Maryland: The Johns Hopkins University Press: 445–463, doi:10.2307/2935950, JSTOR 2935950
- Pilafidis-Williams, K. (1998), The Sanctuary of Aphaia on Aigina in the Bronze Age, Munich, Germany: Hirmer, ISBN 978-3-7774-8010-7
- Poehlmann, Egert (2017), "Aristotle on Music and Theatre (Politics VIII 6. 1340 b 20 - 1342 b 34; Poetics)", in Fountoulakis, Andreas; Markantonatos, Andreas; Vasilaros, Georgios (eds.), Theatre World: Critical Perspectives on Greek Tragedy and Comedy. Studies in Honour of Georgia Xanthakis-Karamenos, Berlin, Germany: Walter de Gruyter, ISBN 978-3-11-051896-2
- Pollitt, J. J. (1999) [1972], Art and Experience in Classical Greece (revised ed.), Cambridge, England: Cambridge University Press, ISBN 978-0-521-09662-1
- Powell, Barry B. (2012) [2004], "Myths of Aphrodite, Artemis, Athena", Classical Myth (Seventh ed.), London, England: Pearson, pp. 211–235, ISBN 978-0-205-17607-6
- Puhvel, Jaan (1987), Comparative Mythology, Baltimore, Maryland: Johns Hopkins University Press, ISBN 978-0-8018-3938-2
- Randolph, Adrian W. B. (2002), Engaging Symbols: Gender, Politics, and Public Art in Fifteenth-century Florence, New Haven, Connecticut: Yale University Press, ISBN 978-0-300-09212-7
- Robertson, Noel (1992), Festivals and Legends: The Formation of Greek Cities in the Light of Public Ritual, Toronto: University of Toronto Press
- Roman, Luke; Roman, Monica (2010), Encyclopedia of Greek and Roman Mythology, New York City, New York: Infobase Publishing, ISBN 978-0-8160-7242-2
- Ruck, Carl A.P.; Staples, Danny (1994), The World of Classical Myth: Gods and Goddesses, Heroines and Heroes, Durham, North Carolina: Carolina Academic Press, ISBN 978-0890895757
- Sax, Boria (4 April 2003). Crow. London, UK: Reaktion Boos LTD. ISBN 1-86189-194-6.
- Schaus, Gerald P.; Wenn, Stephen R. (2007), Onward to the Olympics: Historical Perspectives on the Olympic Games, Publications of the Canadian Institute in Greece, vol. 5, Ontario, Canada: Wilfrid Laurier University Press, ISBN 978-0-88920-505-5
- Schmitt, P. (2000), "Athena Apatouria et la ceinture. Les aspects féminins des apatouries à Athènes", Annales: Economies, Societies, Civilisations, London, England: Thames and Hudson, pp. 1059–1073
- Seelig, Beth J. (August 2002), "The Rape of Medusa in the Temple of Athena: Aspects of Triangulation in the Girl", The International Journal of Psychoanalysis, 83 (4): 895–911, doi:10.1516/3NLL-UG13-TP2J-927M, PMID 12204171, S2CID 28961886
- Simon, Erika (1983), Festivals of Attica: An Archaeological Commentary, Madison, Wisconsin: The University of Wisconsin Press, ISBN 978-0-299-09184-2
- Swiatek, Anthony; Breen, Walter (1981). The Encyclopedia of United States Silver & Gold Commemorative Coins, 1892 to 1954. New York City, New York: Arco Publishing. ISBN 978-0-668-04765-4.
- Telenius, Seppo Sakari, (2005) 2006. Athena-Artemis (Helsinki: Kirja kerrallaan).
- Trahman, C.R. (1952), "Odysseus' Lies ('Odyssey', Books 13–19)", Phoenix, 6 (2), Classical Association of Canada: 31–43, doi:10.2307/1086270, JSTOR 1086270
- Ventris, Michael; Chadwick, John (1973) [1953], Documents in Mycenaean Greek, Cambridge, England: Cambridge University Press, ISBN 978-1107503410
- Walcot, P. (April 1977), "The Judgement of Paris", Greece & Rome, 24 (1), Cambridge, England: Cambridge University Press: 31–39, doi:10.1017/S0017383500019616, JSTOR 642687, S2CID 162573370
- Wolkstein, Diane; Kramer, Samuel Noah (1983), Inanna: Queen of Heaven and Earth: Her Stories and Hymns from Sumer, New York City, New York: Harper&Row Publishers, ISBN 978-0-06-090854-6
- Wunder, Eduard (1855). Sophocles' Oedipus rex, Oedipus Colonaeus, Electra, Antigone. Vol. I. London: Williams and Norgate.
