= Dexamenos of Chios =

Ancient Greek artisan

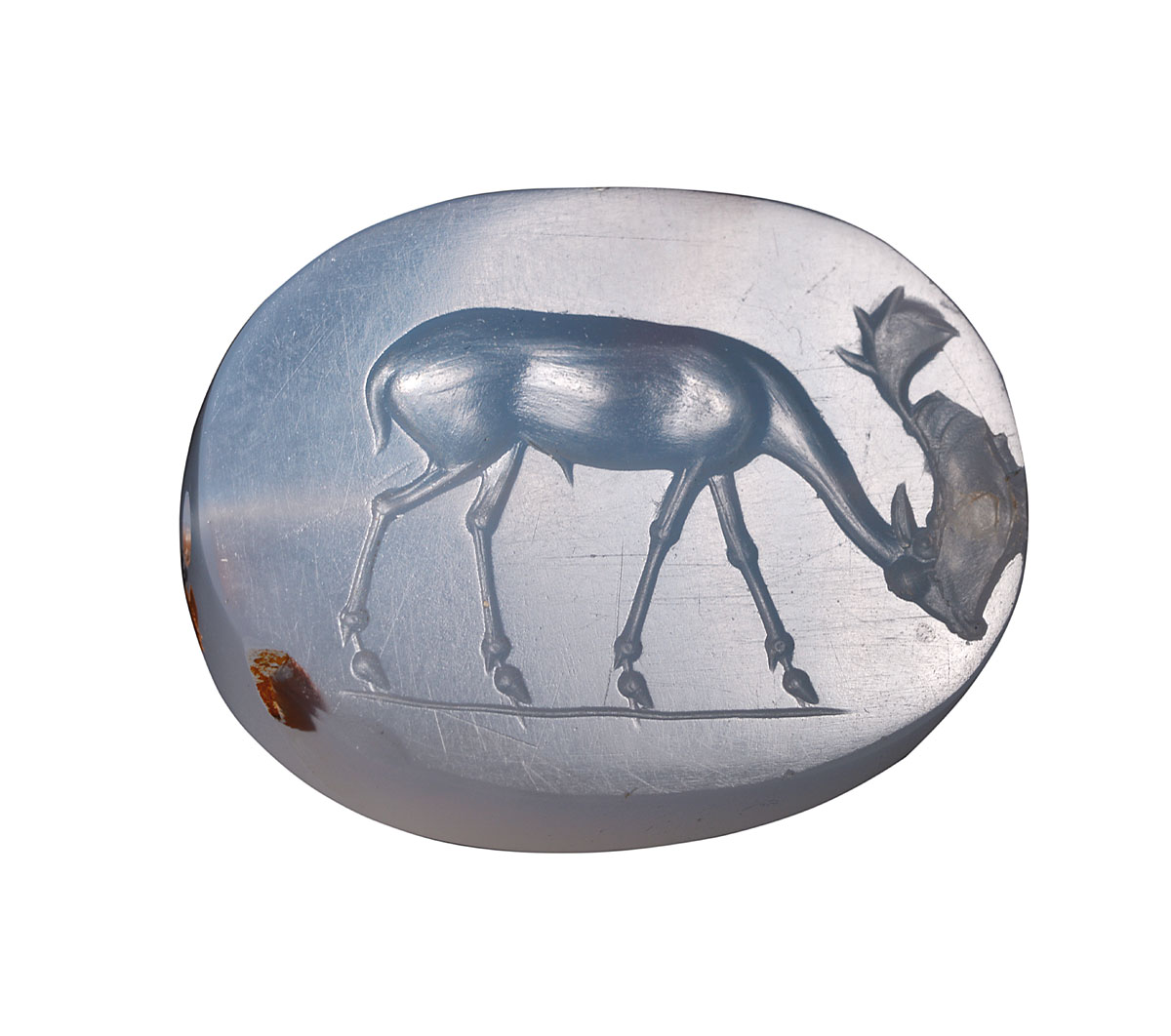
Chalcedonian precious stone attributed to Dexamenos, depicting a deer.

Dexamenos of Chios was a gem engraver of Ancient Greece, active in his craft between 420 and 400 BC. He was one of the most talented artists in sculpture, and his works are considered among the finest in their art. There are only four stones signed with his name, but other works are attributed to him due to their style.

The prominent presence of his signature on four works suggests that he was proud of his art.

Contemporary scholars debate whether he worked in Athens (where he may have been influenced by Phidias) or north of the Black Sea.
