= Athena Areia =

Ancient Greek mythological epithet

Areia (Ancient Greek: Ἀρεία) was a cultic epithet of the Greek goddess Athena, under which she was worshipped at Athens and Plataea.

== Worship ==
Athena's worship under this name was said to have been instituted by Orestes after he had been acquitted by the Areopagus of the murder of his mother. It was Athena Areia who gave her casting vote in cases where the Areopagites were equally divided.

There is some epigraphic evidence of a distinct priesthood for this aspect of Athena, but all we have are incomplete fragments, primarily of an oath from this priesthood at Acharnae.

From these circumstances, it has been surmised by some scholars (primarily in the 19th century) that the name "Areia" ought not to be derived from Ares, but from "ara" (ἀρά), a prayer, or from "areo" (ἀρέω) or "aresko" (ἀρέσκω), to propitiate or atone for. This is not considered likely by modern scholars.

C. Hocker and L. Schneider suggest that by adopting the role and name of Ares, Athena—the patron goddess of Athens—appears to be symbolically asserting her dominance over Ares, the usual protector of the treacherous city of Thebes.

== Statues ==
Athena's statue, together with those of Ares, Aphrodite Areia, and Enyo, stood in the temple of Ares at Athens.

=== Phidian Athena Areia in Plataea temple ===
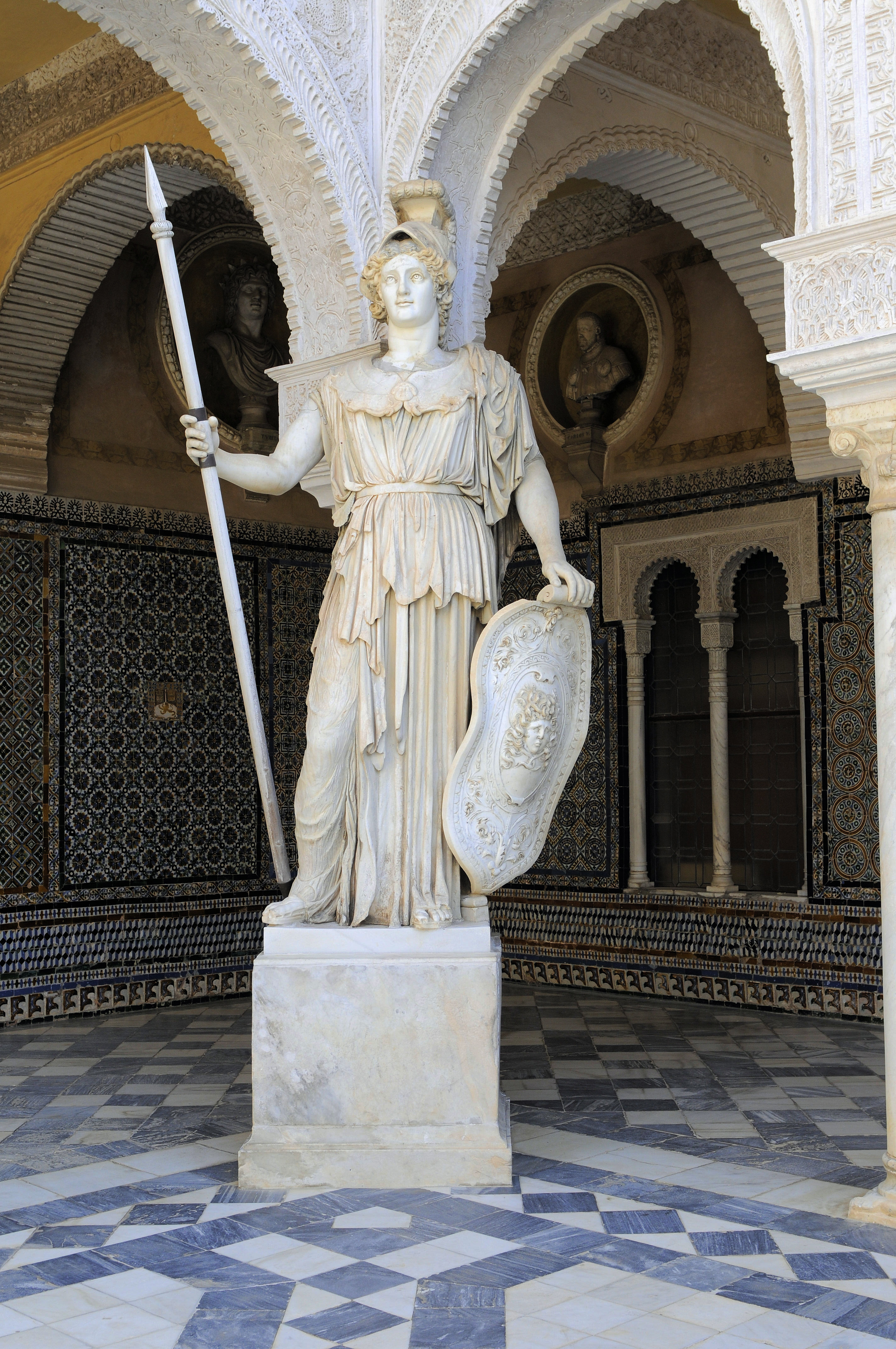
Example of Athena Medici type (with additions)

According to Pausanias (IXA.I-2) the colossal acrolithic statue of Athena Areis (with a gilded, wooden body and marble face, feet and hands), stand at a temple at Plataea, built from the spoils given to that city by the Athenians after the Battle of Marathon. It was made by Pheidias and was a little bit smaller than his great bronze Athena Promachos on the Athenian Akropolis (10–15 m). Pronaos walls of this temple were decorated with wall paintings by Onasias ("Campaign of the Seven against Thebes") and Polygnotos ("Odysseus after he had killed the Suitors").

Plutarch mentions a gilded statue in this temple, but does not specify the name of the deity it honors and the authorship.

This statue was supposedly created by the artist Pheidias. It should be his early work. There is some disagreement among modern scholars whether this was indeed created by that artist.

Besides being acrolithic and built on a very large scale, there are no descriptions of the Athena Areia's appearance in the sources. By Hocker and Schneider it is identified with the Athena Medici type, due to similarities in technique, size, and style. Most replicas of the Medici type are approximately 3 meters tall, which is probably also the size of the Athena Areia. Their attribution is disputed, for example, the Medici type is probably too late. Other candidate for Areia is Athena torso in Madrid.

== Bibliography ==
- Ridder, A. de (1920) Le temple d' Athena Areia it Platees. BCH 44, 160–69
- Lapatin, K. D. S. (2001) Chryselephantine Statuary in the Ancient Mediterranean World, 61–62, 198–199. Oxford: Oxford University Press.
- Strocka, V. M. (2004) Pheidias, section on Athena Areia, in Kiinstlerlexikon der Antike, Vol. 2, 213–14, edited by Vollkommer, D. and R. Munchen: K. G. Sauro
- Thiersch, H. (1938) Die Athena Areia des Phidias und der torso Medici in Paris. Nachrichten Göttingen NF II, 10, 211ff.
