= Archaeological Civic Museum of Bologna =

Archaeological museum in Bologna, Italy

Coordinates: 44°29′34″N 11°20′38″E

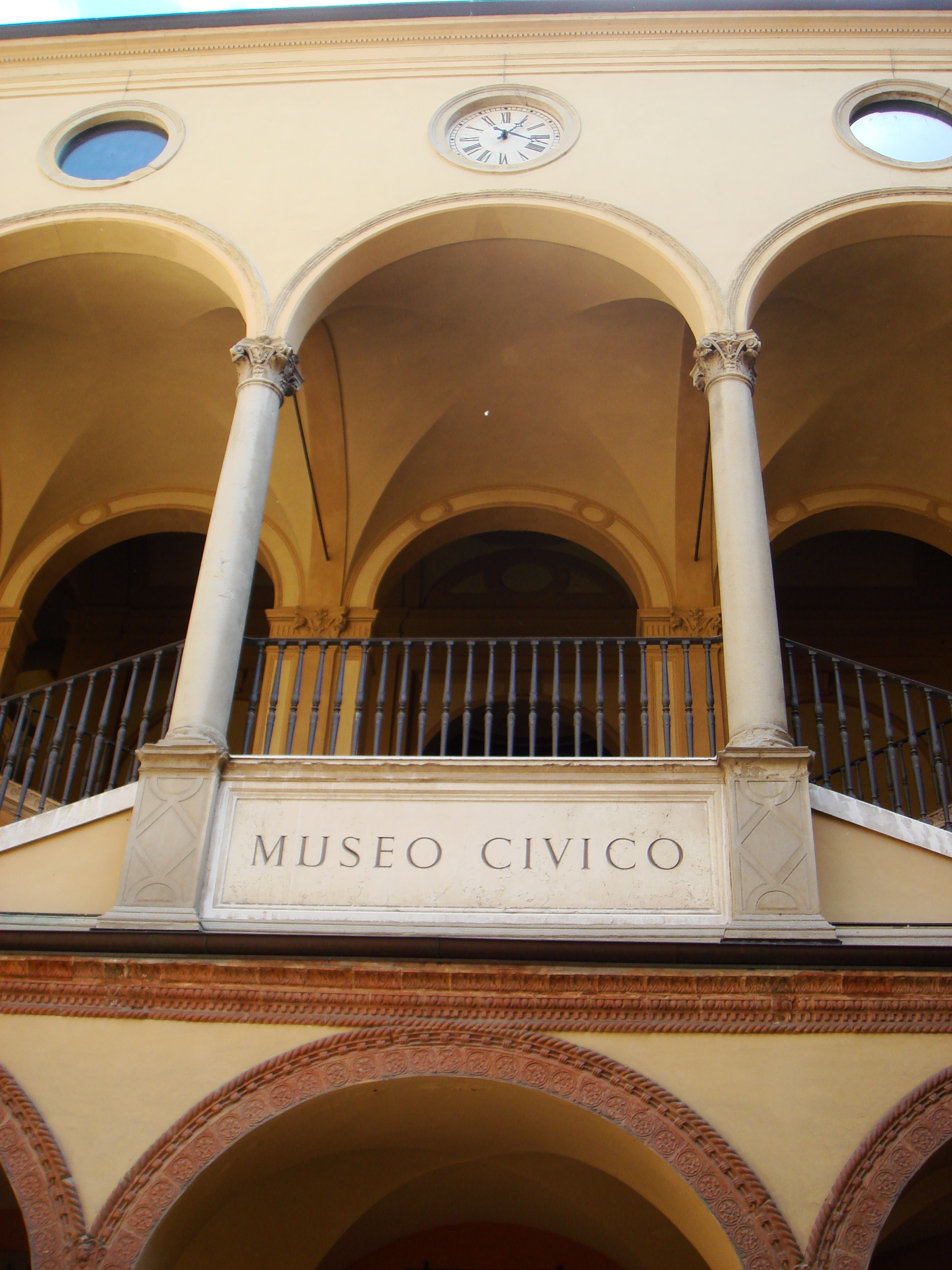
Internal courtyard of the museum

The Archaeological Civic Museum of Bologna (Italian: Museo Civico Archeologico di Bologna) is located in the fifteenth-century Palazzo Galvani building at Via dell'Archiginnasio 2 postal code 40124 Bologna, once known as the Hospital of Death. Founded in September 1881 by the merging of two separate museums: the one belonging to the University of Bologna – heir of the Room of Antiquity belonging to the Academy of Sciences founded by Luigi Ferdinando Marsili in (1714) – and that belonging to the City of Bologna (enriched by the antique collection of Artist Pelagio Palagi (1860) and the large amount of finds from excavations conducted in and around Bologna during these times.

This museum is among the most important in archeological finds in Italy and is highly representative of the local history from prehistoric period to Roman Age. Additionally, its ancient Egyptian collection is among the most important in Europe. Between 1972 and 2012 the Museum has housed over 150 exhibitions with focus on archeology but also on arts.

== Collections ==
=== The Prehistoric Section ===
Out on exposition are materials from the Lower Paleolithic Age (almost 700,000 years ago) until the Late Bronze Age (10th century B.C.). The Paleolithic times are documented by items made of flint and chert: bi-facial choppers, points, scrapers, and cores. However, items representing the Mesolithic Age (11,000 years ago) and Neolithic Age (4,500 to 3,000 years ago), are more scarce. With the Bronze Age, finds became more frequent as testified by the numerous ceramic containers, tools made of bone, horn and metal, discovered, together with the casting moulds, in the big villages on the plain during the early half of the second millennium BC. The section is completed by prehistoric materials coming from Italy, Europe, and beyond.

=== The Etruscan Section ===
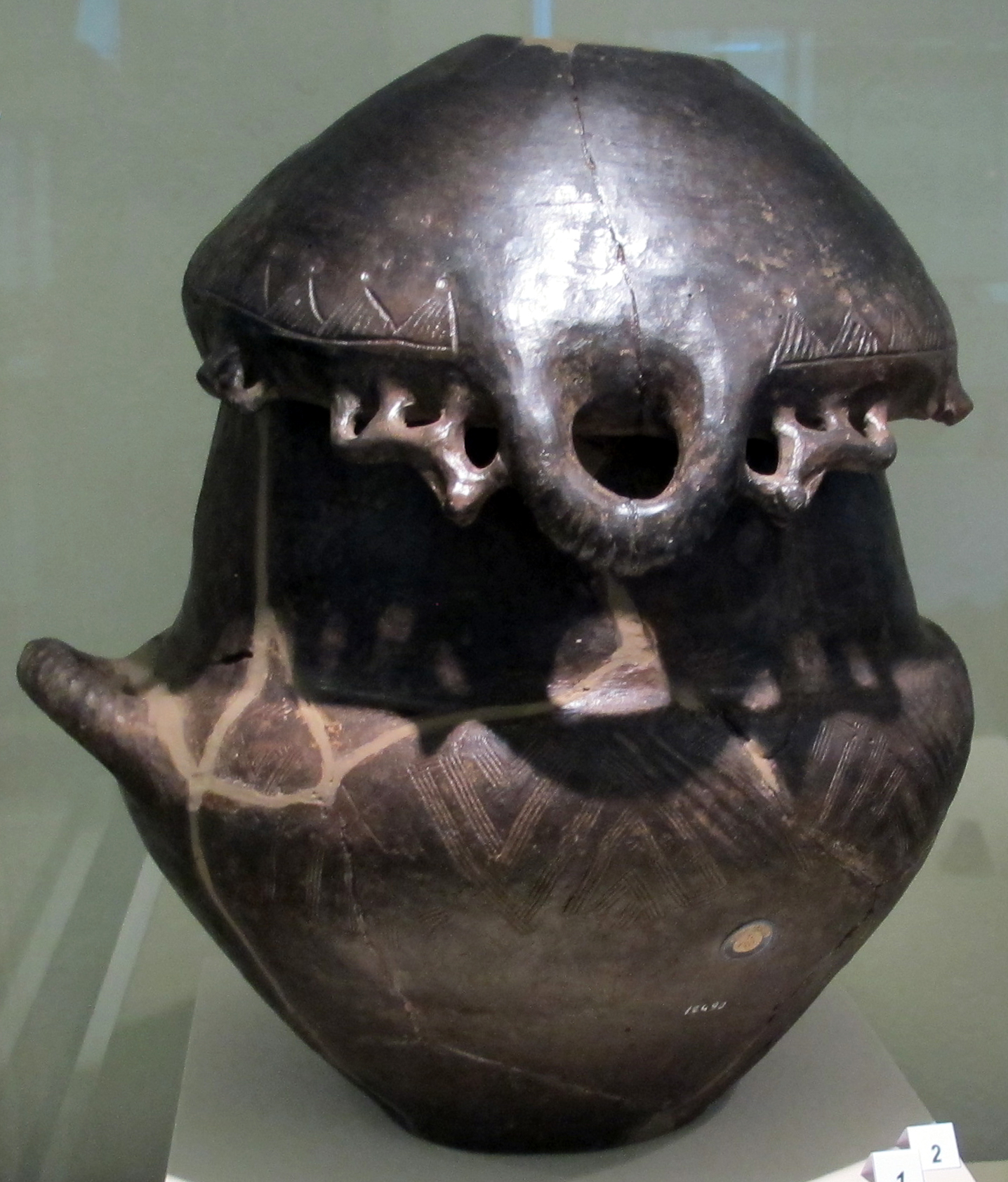
Biconical ossuary from a burial ground in Via Savena, tomb 120, Villanovan I. From IX century B.C. - The Archaeological Civic Museum (MCA) of Bologna

This section of the museum displays material from diggings from the 19th and mid 20th centuries done within the Bolognese area and deals with the reconstruction of the development of the ancient settlement of the Etruscan civilization from its origins (9th century B.C.) to the founding of the city of Felsina (the settlement of Bologna during Etruscan times) between the middle of the 6th and 5th centuries B.C.

The oldest phases of the Etruscan Bologna (Villanovan and Orientalising, from the 9th to the middle of the 6th century B.C.) are illustrated by the vast selection from the approximately 4,000 tomb kits discovered: vases characterised by a bi-conical form (for the deposition of the ashes of the dead), objects for personal use and bronze tools, pottery and bronze vases. Among the many pieces on display one may find: the Benacci askos, a very rare vase typology used to contain the oil for the lanterns and the "closet of Saint Frances" i.e. the deposit of a foundry made of a big vase (dolium) containing more than 14,000 bronze pieces.

The urban phase of Felsina (mid 6th century B.C. - beginning of the 4th century B.C.) is primarily represented by tomb kits. Some standouts are the "Tomba grande" (Great Tomb) and the "Tomba dello sgabello" (Tomb of the footstool) coming from the rich necropolis of Giardini Margherita. They include some fine vases from Greece for drinking wine, others were luxury goods like a large candle holder or a seat made of ivory. Worth mentioning is also the "Certosa's Situla", a refined bronze container decorated with scenes of military, civic, and religious life.

A room is dedicated to the Villanovan culture of Verucchio (the main site of Romagna of the first Iron Age) where a prince tomb is on display characterised by small tables for offerings, china, a throne with a wooden footrest, all perfectly preserved.

=== The Celtic Section ===
The Etruscan society ended in Bologna during the beginning of the 4th century B.C. with a Celtic invasion that occupied a great part of Italy north of the Apennines and the Marche region. The Boi tribe settled in the Bolognese area. This section displays the most important kits of the Celtic necropolises in Bologna, characterized by the presence of traditional trans-Alpine iron weapons and the use of Etruscan-made fine china for banquets.

=== The Lapidarium ===
The larger part of the contents in this section are Roman tombstones coming from Bologna and its surroundings dated between the 1st century B.C. and the mid 2nd century A.D. Emperor Nero's statue with cuirass might be of particular interest (mid 1st century a.d.) discovered during the 15th century at the seat of the destroyed Roman theater, Piazza de' Celestini. Also present in the courtyard a series of milestones of the via Emilia road.

=== The Greek Collection ===
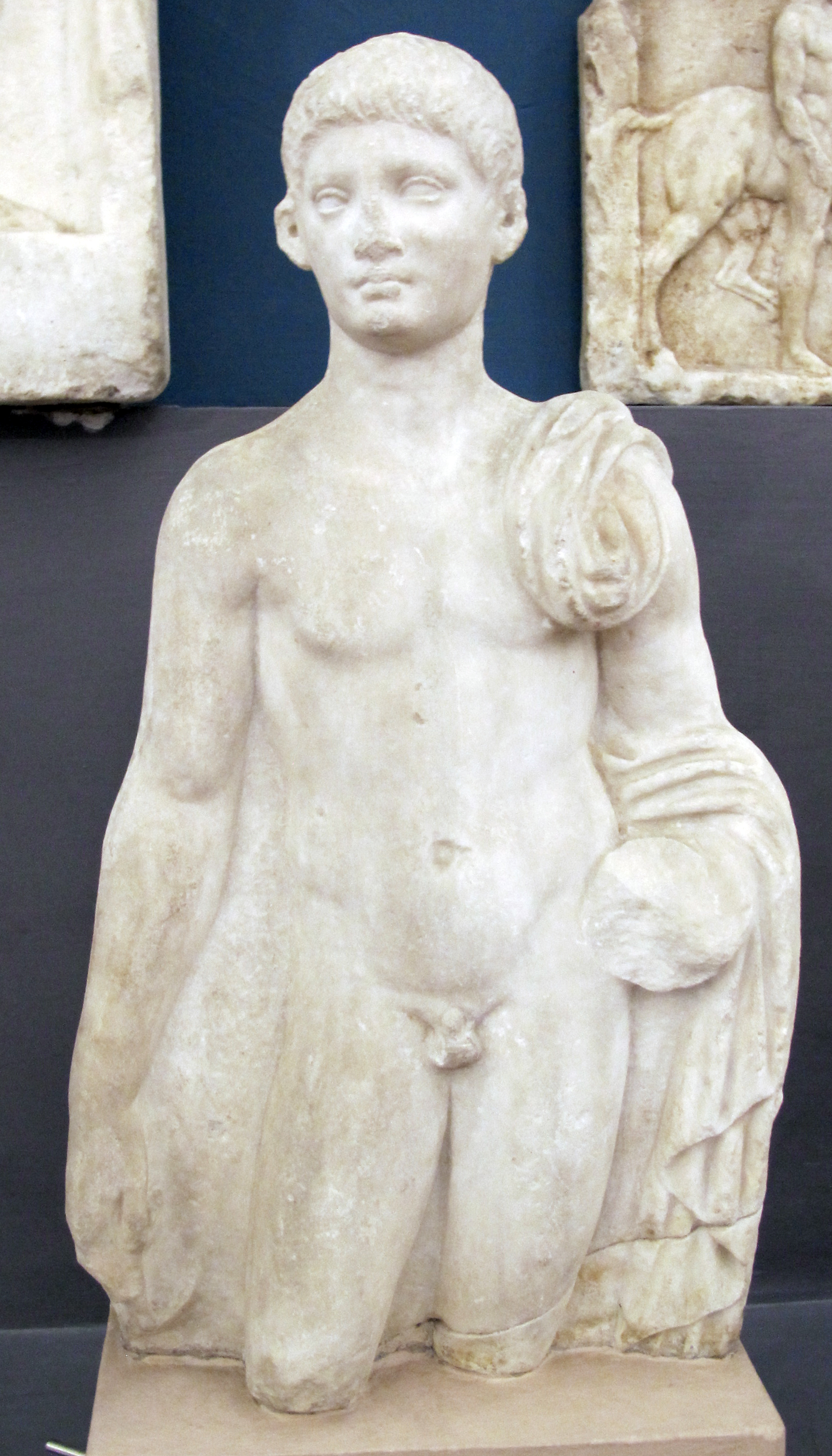
Greek art, fragment of an Attic funerary stele with an athlete, 4th century B.C. Museo Civico Archeologico di Bologna

Here on display is the most representative find of the Palagi Collection: the head of Lemnia Athena, a marble copy of Augustan times of a bronze statue made by Fidia during the 5th century B.C. Also the other marbles finds on display are mainly Roman remakes of original Greek pieces. The Greek ceramics collection is very rich, most pieces are of Attic make and, along with others, of Magna Graecia make.

Also valuable are the finds of jewellery and antique and modern gems. Two computer stations are available for the consultation of this section's database.

=== The Roman Collection ===
This one is a large collection of glass table wear, shaped bronzes, and domestic instruments such as keys, pots, needles, spoons, bells, weights, scales, and more fine china. The series on Early-Christian ivory art (diptychs and ciborias), decorated with sacred and profane motives (5th century B.C.). The marble sculptures are statues and public and private portraits, documents of the activity of the Roman shops during imperial times.

=== Egyptian Collection ===
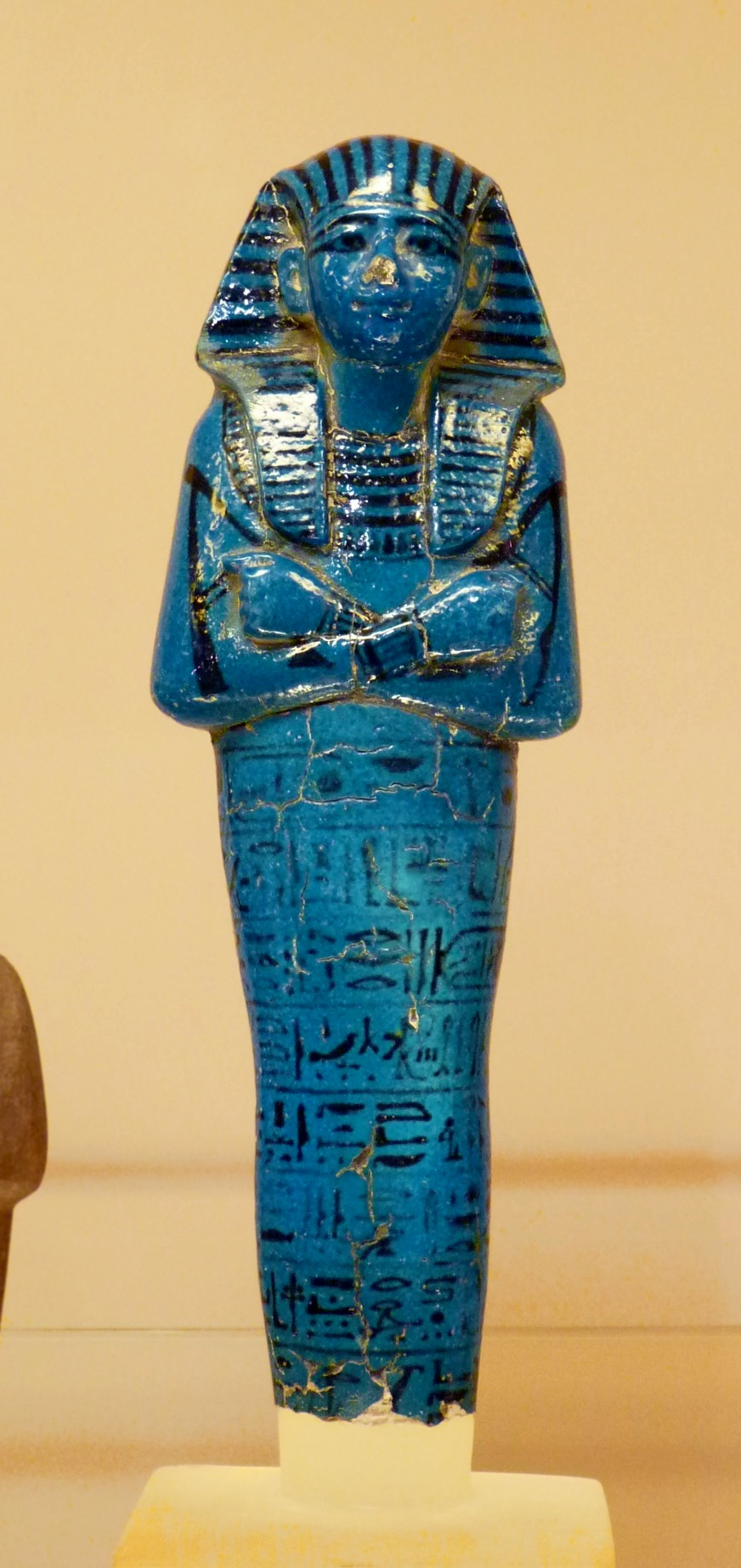
Ushabti of pharaoh Seti I (ruled 1290–1279 BC). Blue faience (H. 26 cm), from Thebes, Reign of Seti I, 19th dynasty, New Kingdom

With 3,500 objects on display, the museum's Egyptian collection is among the most important in Europe. The sarcophagi, the stele, and ushabti all document three-thousand years of a society. The modern staging of these makes for a chronological order, starting from the Old Kingdom all the way to the Ptolemaic period, with sections of further investigation on areas of particular interest. Among those are funeral instruments, scriptures, and amulets. More over, the most-noted discoveries from most important excavations are those that come from the tomb of Horemheb, located in Saqqara (13th century BC) – a recently uncovered monument to which the museum dedicates a computer-graphic video.

=== The Numismatic Collection ===
The Archeological Museum also prizes a wide numismatics collection of nearly 100,000 specimen of coins, medals, and other coinage. Among the most important collections, noted are the consistent cores of the Roman samples (from the republican and imperial times), samples from Italian coin-making factories, and the cores from papal medallions. The database of this collection is not available to the public but can be consulted by making an appointment with museum.

=== The Collection of plaster casts ===
It is a collection of plaster copies of celebrated Roman and Greek sculptures.

== Services ==
The Museum is endowed with the following: an educational department, a specialized library with a reading lounge, a historic archive (available for consultation with an appointment), a photographic archive (also available for consultation with appointment or by written request), a restoration lab, special access for disabled visitors, rooms for temporary expositions, a conference room, and a bookshop.
