= Phidian =

Phidian may refer to

- Phidias, 5th century BC Greek sculptor
- the art of sculpture
