= Athena Promachos =

Bronze statue of Athena

Coordinates: 37°58′18″N 23°43′33″E

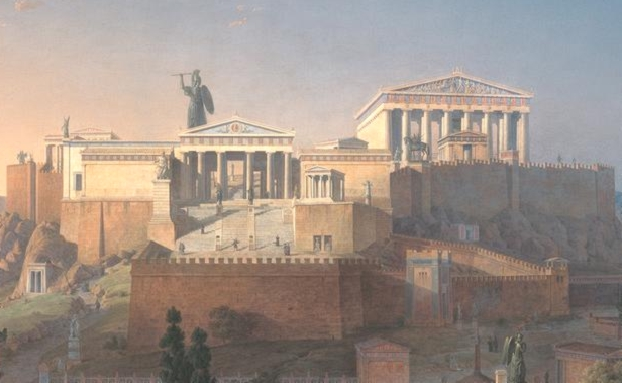
Idealised view of the Acropolis with the bronze Athena Promachos carrying a great spear in her right hand (rather than with an owl as indicated from copies and coins), by the painter Leo von Klenze in 1846, who portrayed the great statue of Athena Promachos as visible from far away, as reported in ancient texts.

The Athena Promachos (Ἀθηνᾶ Πρόμαχος, "Athena who fights in the front line") was a colossal bronze statue of Athena sculpted by Phidias, which stood between the Propylaea and the Parthenon on the Acropolis of Athens. Athena was the tutelary deity of Athens and the goddess of wisdom and warriors. Pheidias also sculpted two other figures of Athena on the Acropolis, the huge gold and ivory ("chryselephantine") cult image of Athena Parthenos in the Parthenon and the Lemnian Athena.

The designation Athena Promachos is not attested before a dedicatory inscription of the early fourth century CE; Pausanias (1.28.2) referred to it as "the great bronze Athena" on the Acropolis.

== History ==
The Athena Promachos was one of the earliest recorded works by Phidias and was originally a well-known and famous Athenian landmark. According to the Greek traveler and geographer, Pausanias, the top of Athena's helmet as well as the tip of her spear could be seen by sailors and anyone approaching Athens from Attica, at Sounion. It originally stood between the Erechtheion and the Propylaea.

Erected around 456 BCE, the Athena Promachos was either to memorialize the Battle of Marathon or the Greco-Persian Wars which is possibly what the dedicatory inscription refers to; this inscription also mentions that the trophies won in the Persian War were once placed around the pedestal of the statue. It took somewhere near nine years to construct. According to the Greek Byzantine historian Niketas Choniates, the Athena Promachos stood at around 9 metres (30 ft) tall. It is known that the statue was to be a 'thanks' after war but there are many disagreements about which war. It has also been suggested that the Athena Promachos may have been a cult statue. For a long time there was speculation if the Athena Promachos even existed, however most scholars now agree that it did as there is proof from Roman coins that depict it.

Surviving accounts for the creation process for the sculpture cover nine years, but the dates are not identifiable, because the names of officials are missing. The sculpture may have commemorated Cimon's defeat of the Persians at the Eurymedon in 467 BCE or the peace of Callias in approximately 450 or 449 BCE.

During archaeological excavations in 1878, 1963/1964 and from 2001 onwards, a bronze casting workshop was uncovered on the southern slope of the Acropolis, where, according to the preserved features and finds, the Athena Promachos was probably produced.

Made entirely of bronze, the Athena Promachos was spoken of as both 'the bronze Athena' and 'the great bronze Athena,' in ancient times. The term 'Promachos' meaning 'fighting before' or 'in front of' was not originally used when referring to the statue; this nickname came later, most notably being used by Zosimus.

Athena Promachos stood overlooking her city for approximately 1000 years, until shortly after 465 CE, when the sculpture was transported to Constantinople (capital of the Eastern Roman Empire) as a trophy in the Forum of Constantine, which became the last bastion and safe haven for many surviving Greek bronze sculptures under the protection of the Eastern Empire's Imperial court. Niketas Choniates documented a riot taking place in the Forum of Constantine in Constantinople in 1203 CE where a large, bronze, statue of Athena was destroyed by a "drunken crowd" which is now thought to have been the Athena Promachos.

== Iconography ==
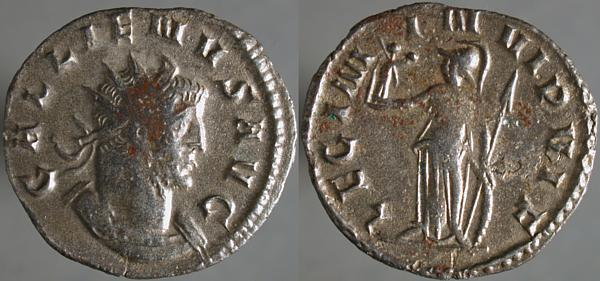
A Roman coin depicting Gallienus (r. 253–268) with one of several images of Athena Promachos. This type is currently considered as the statue of Phidias.

The engravings on the shield which Athena is holding were originally drafted by the great Greek painter, Parrhasius of Ephesus. Although he drafted them, the engravings were physically done by an engraver named Mys. The engravings were not done during the time the statue was being made but actually added after.

Byzantine author Niketas gives a description of the Athena Parthenos (which does not coincide with the others):

The goddess wore an ankle-length garment tightly belted at the waist and over it an aegis, complete with gorgoneion. Her neck was uncovered. On her head she wore a helmet with a horse-hair crest and her hair could be seen escaping from beneath the helmet on to her forehead. At the back, the hair was plaited. Her left hand held the folds of her dress, while the right was outstretched towards the south.

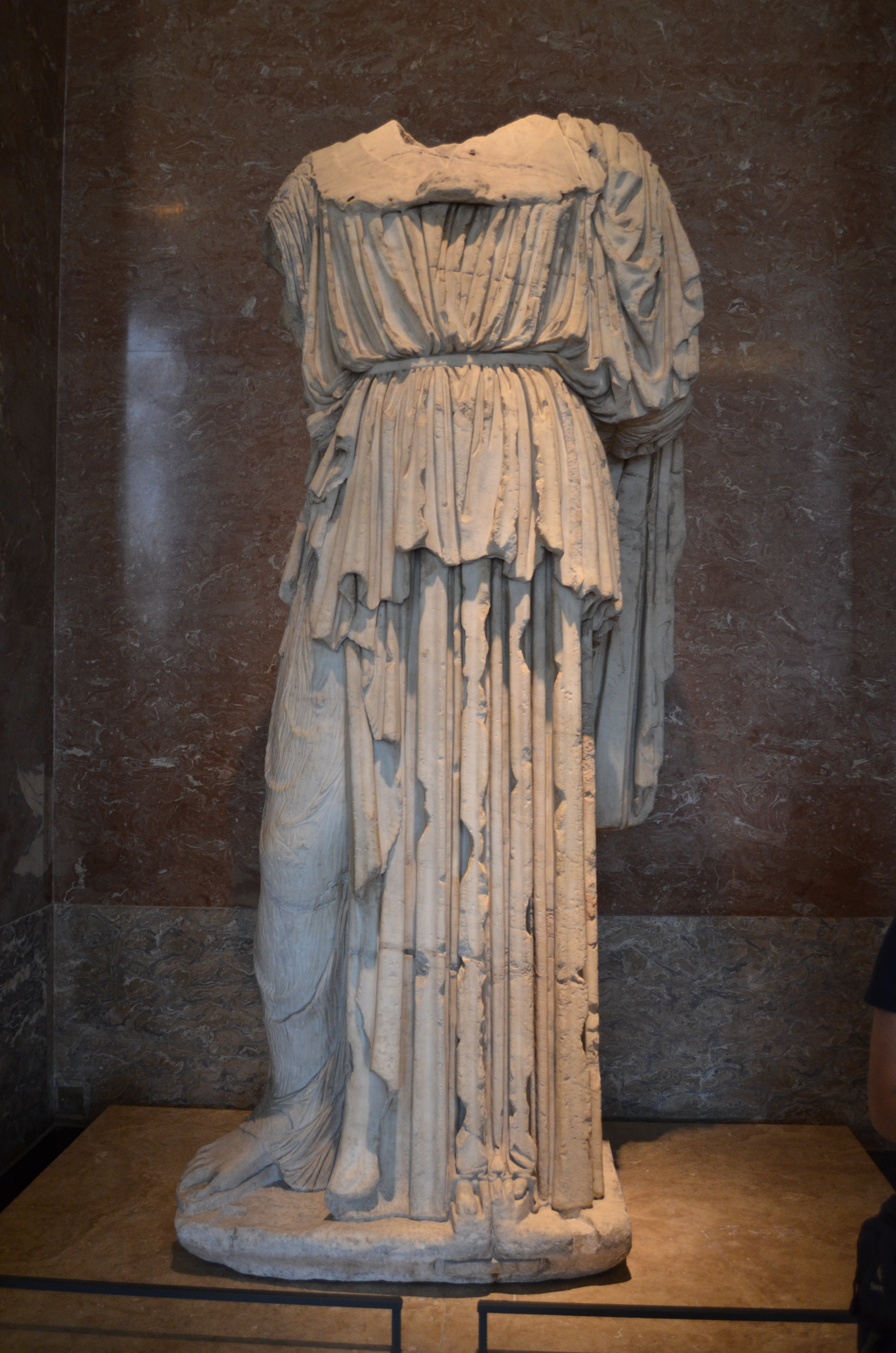
Minerve Ingres

Little is known of its appearance, as the work has been lost, and only images on coins and very imperfect and uneven miniature copies remain, which, however, allow us to get a general idea. Roman coins of the 2nd and 3rd centuries, minted in Athens, which show it among the buildings of the Acropolis, are the most reliable source for reconstructing the image. They show it partially standing, holding in her right hand an image of Nike, with the tip of a spear protruding from her left shoulder. Other Hellenistic and Roman coins show her in full, in a similar position, but it is not certain that they depicted Promachos, and they may also be images of the Athena Parthenos, which some believe looked very similar to her. Olga Palagia summarizing recent research, believes that she was a version very similar to Parthenos, corresponding in general terms to the Roman coins mentioned at the beginning, simply standing, motionless, with a crested helmet covering her head, holding Nike in her right hand and a spear resting on her left shoulder, her hand resting on a shield that touched the ground and leaned against her feet.

Fragmentary Minerve Ingres (Louvre), is a large Roman copy (2.6 m) of a classical Athena, presented as a possible copy of Promachos. However, iconography varies, with other sources showing a huge owl figure at her feet, or an owl on a tree trunk, under her right arm, sometimes associated with a shield, a column, or a snake, and several modern reconstruction proposals have been made, with widely varying results.

Of surviving models thought to represent the type, the two outstanding ones are the Athena Elgin, a small bronze statuette in the Metropolitan Museum of Art, who bears an owl in her outstretched hand (as among some coin types), and possibly the Athena Medici torso in the Louvre, of which there are a number of replicas.

Another very common variant is that Promachos is interpreted as a walking goddess swinging a spear. It is the parallel and older tradition of depicting Athena in her warlike guise, which can be seen on coins, vases, sculptures and other materials, forming a typological family that critics have come also to call Promachos. This type became particularly popular after it was introduced into the decoration of Panathenaic amphoras, but it is difficult to say whether it influenced Phidias in composing the poses in his works. This dynamic and aggressive model regained influence in the 19th-20th centuries among scholars attempting to reconstruct the features of the Phidias Athena Promachos.

Roman variation in Archaic style, from the Villa of the Papyri (Herculaneum)

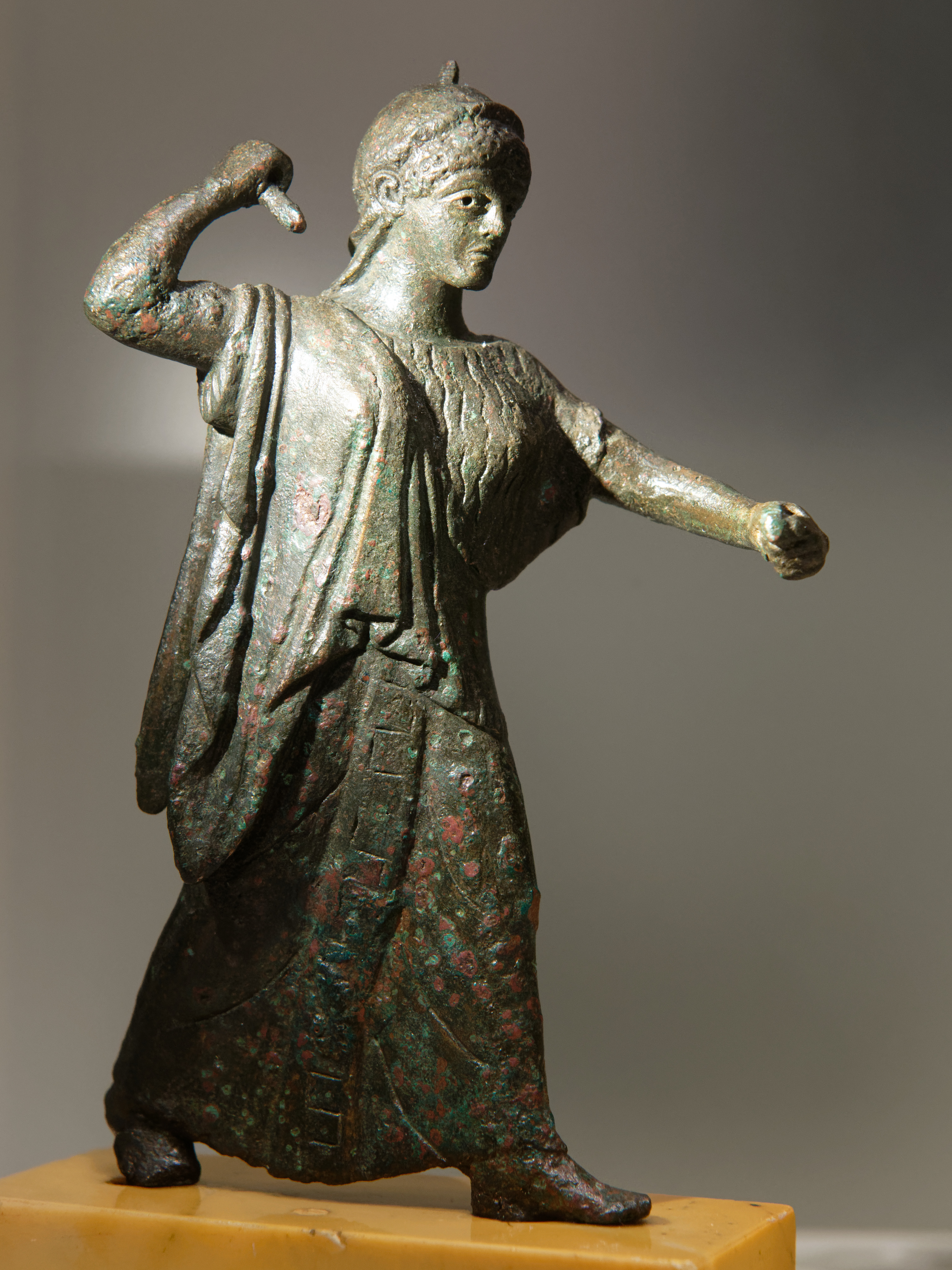
Statuette, BnF

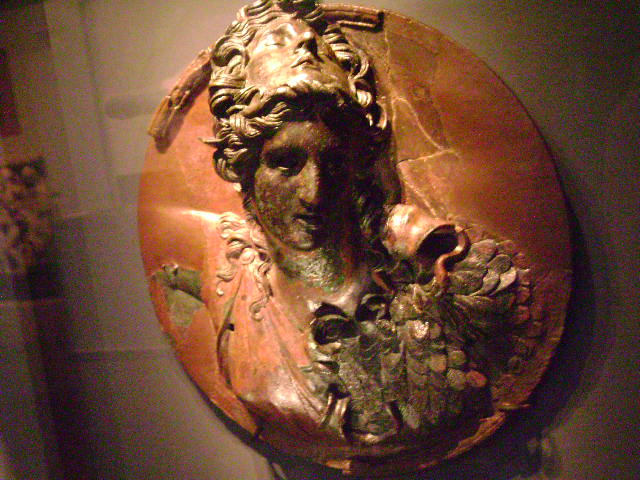
Medallion with head and shoulder, Thessaloniki Archaeological Museum

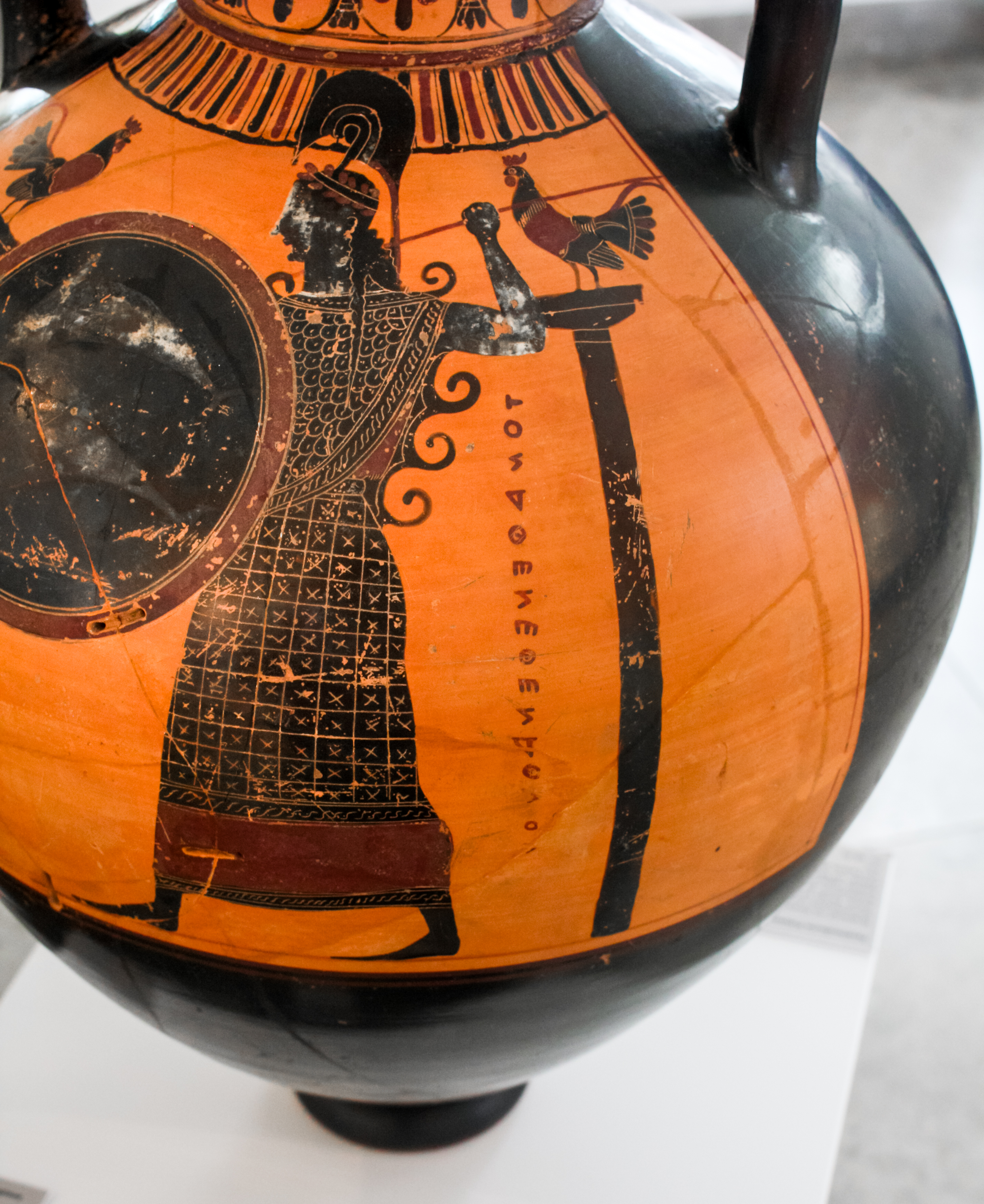
Athena at amphora of panathenaic shape

== Coinage depictions ==
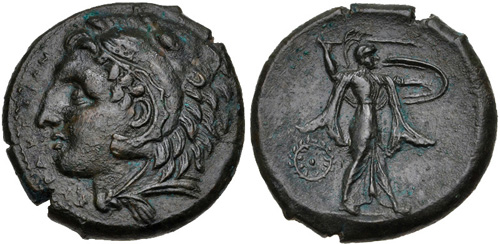
Greek coin depicting the statue.

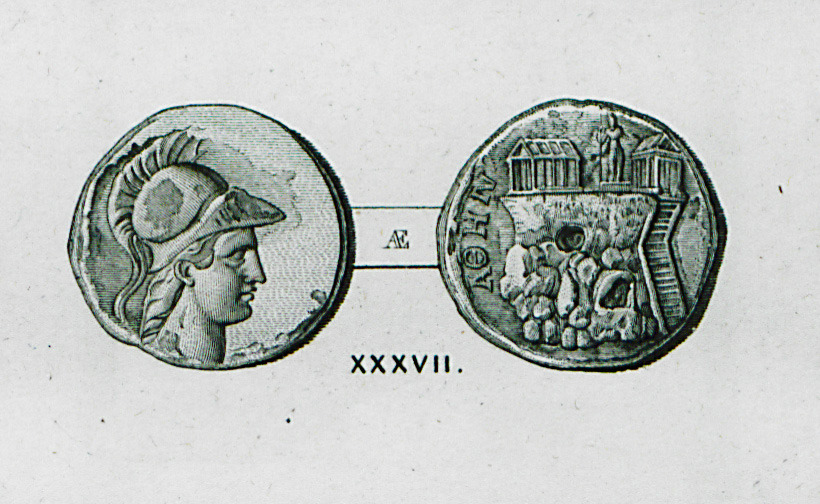
Statue in situ

The very first specific archaistic Athena Promachos coin image was depicted on coins that were issued by Alexander the Great in 326. One side of this coin depicts Heracles while the other side shows the god, Zeus, with Athena by his knee ready to fight with her spear in her right hand and a shield held in her left. Around ten years later, the Athena Promachos appears on coins issued by Ptolemy in Alexandria before taking the title of king around 315 BCE.

Attic coins from the second and third centuries CE show the only known images of Phidias' Athena Promachos. On one side is the depiction of the view of the Acropolis from the north. Between the Propylaia and the Erechtheion, there is large female statue of Athena facing towards the west. As these images place the statue of the Athena Promachos in this specific location, there is no doubt that it existed.

There is another group of provincial Roman coins that depict the bust of Athena alone. In this depiction she is wearing a Corinthian helmet with a "wave" of hair upon her forehead. These coins date from the first half of the second century CE to the second half of the third century CE and are considered to be the most common. Since more coinage depictions of Athena wearing a Corinthian helmet have been found as opposed to those that depict her with an Attic helmet, it is thought that the Corinthian were a more popular representation.
