= Lemnian Athena =

Ancient Greek sculpture by Pheidias

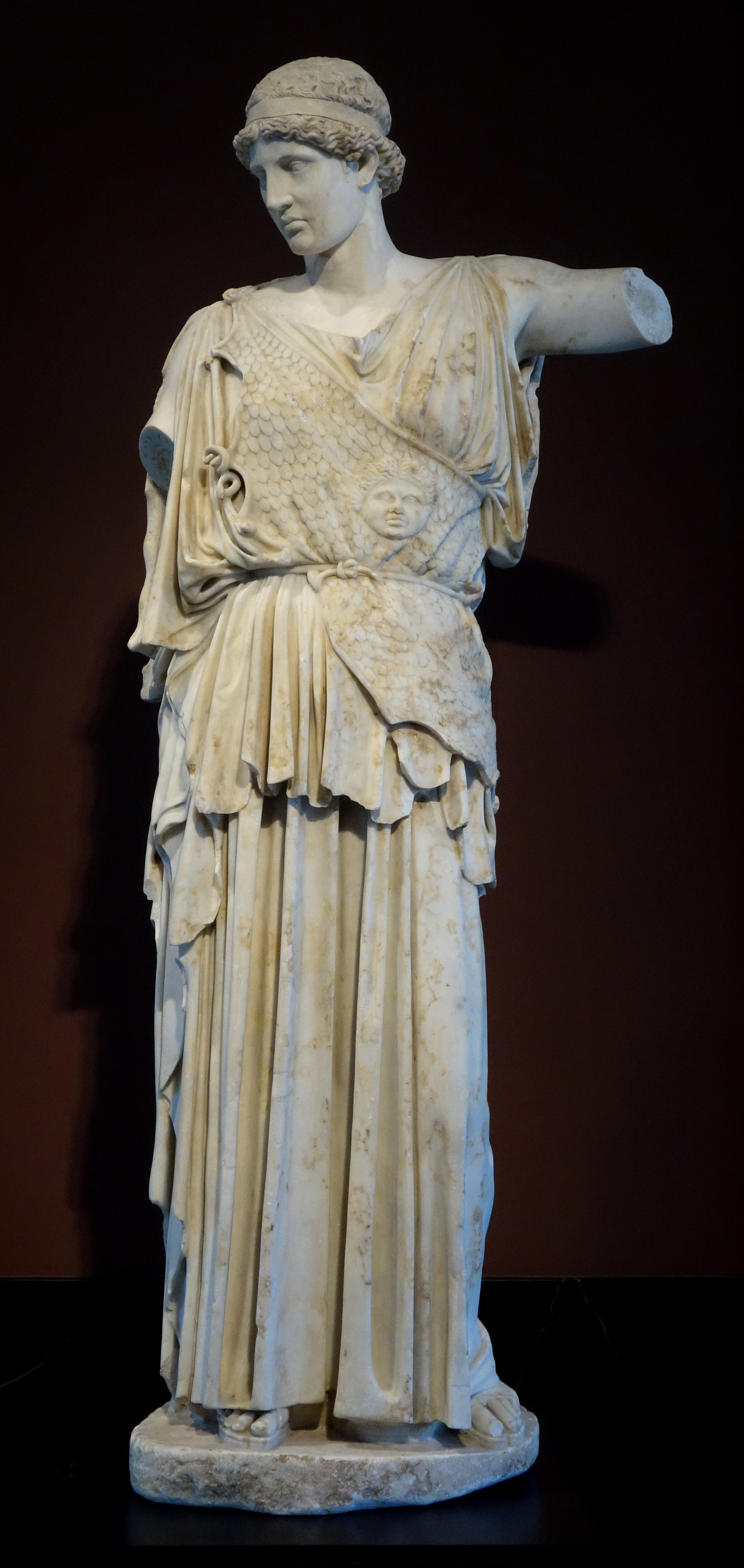
The most complete surviving version of Furtwängler's "Athena Lemnia" type (Dresden Skulpturensammlung Hm 49)

The Lemnian Athena, or Athena Lemnia, was a classical Greek statue of the goddess Athena that stood on the Acropolis of Athens. According to the traveler Pausanias, who visited Athens in the 2nd century CE, the statue was created by Pheidias, a sculptor of the 5th century BCE, and dedicated by the inhabitants of the island of Lemnos. In addition to Pausanias, two other authors of the Roman period, Lucian and Aelius Aristides, mention the statue by name, and it may also be alluded to by Pliny the Elder and the Late Roman rhetorician Himerius. The ancient sources suggest that the statue was greatly admired: Pausanias calls it "the most worth seeing" (θέας μάλιστα ἄξιον) of all of Pheidias's works, and in Lucian's dialogue the answer to the question "Which of Pheidias's works do you praise the most?" is "What other than the goddess of Lemnos?"

Since the 1890s the name "Athena Lemnia" has been associated with a specific ancient statue type, which depicts Athena without a helmet and wearing an aegis diagonally across her breast. This type is known from several Roman copies or free imitations, of which the most important are:

- A head in the Archaeological Museum of Bologna, often called the "Palagi head", because it was previously in the collection of the artist Pelagio Palagi.
- A statue in the Skulpturensammlung of the Staatliche Kunstsammlungen Dresden, sometimes known as Dresden statue A. Although the head was damaged during a 17th-century restoration in which a helmet was added, it belongs to the same type as the Palagi head in Bologna. This statue, acquired in 1728 from the Albani collection in Rome, is the only example that preserves both the head and the body together.
- A second statue body in Dresden, sometimes known as Dresden statue B, also from the Albani collection in Rome. The upper breast and head are missing from this example; the breast has been restored with a plaster cast of the relevant part of Dresden statue A, and the head with a plaster cast of the Palagi head.

Other surviving examples of the type include a body in Kassel and heads in Baia, Oxford, Toronto, and the Vatican Museums.

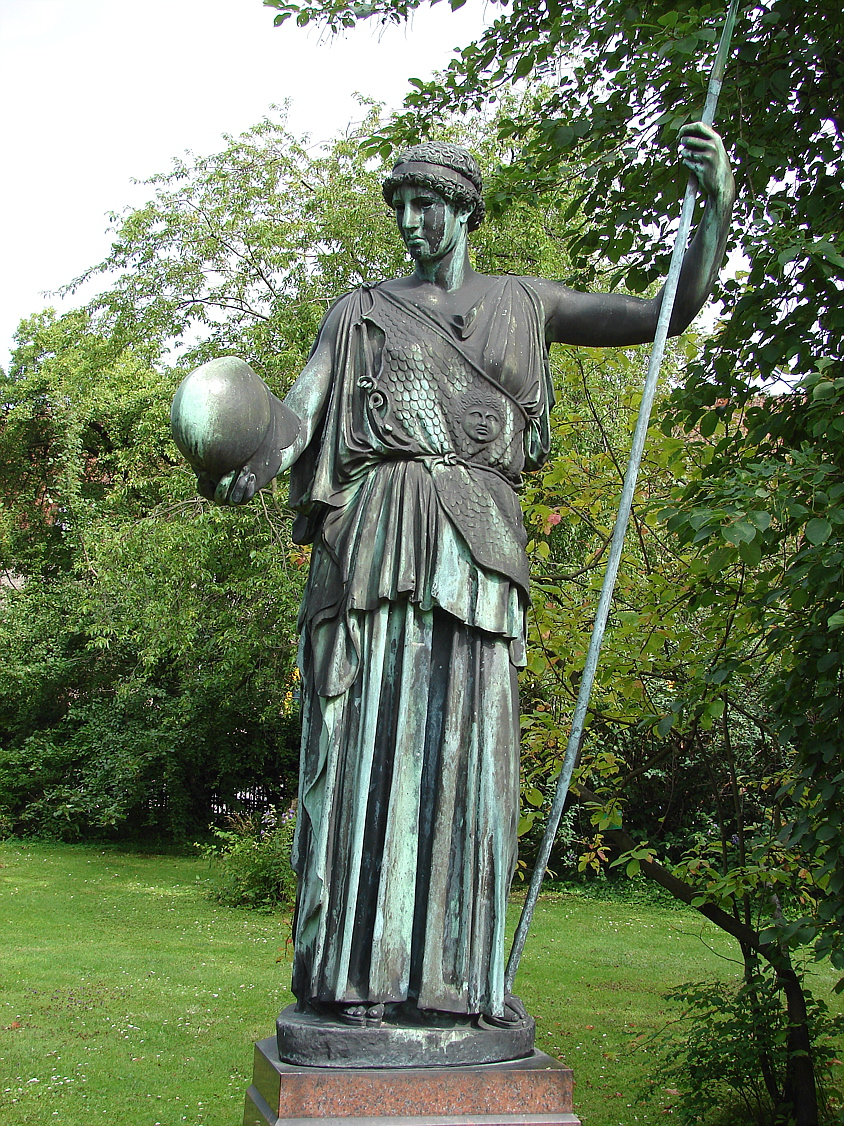
A modern reconstruction of Furtwängler's "Athena Lemnia" type, with helmet and spear (Copenhagen Botanical Garden)

In 1891 the archaeologist Adolf Furtwangler reunited the body of Dresden statue A with its proper head, which had been removed during an earlier restoration, and recognized that the head was of the same type as that in Bologna. He argued that these Roman heads and bodies all derived from the same Classical Greek sculptural type, and that they were copies of Pheidias's Lemnian Athena on the Athenian Acropolis. Although only the upper arms of the statue bodies in Dresden survive, Furtwängler cited a depiction on an ancient engraved gem, which appeared to show a head and upper body of the same type, as evidence that the goddess held a helmet in her outstretched right hand and an upright spear in her left hand.

Furtwängler's conclusions, although widely accepted, have sometimes been questioned by other scholars. The most forceful criticism of his physical reconstruction of the type was published in 1983 by Kim Hartswick, who argued that the Dresden bodies and the Bologna head are unrelated, and that the gems depicting the statue may be modern rather than ancient. In 1984, however, a reexamination of the join between the head and the body of Dresden statue A and a technical analysis of the marble confirmed that the two pieces do indeed belong together, as Furtwangler believed. It is now generally agreed that Furtwängler's reconstruction of the type is largely accurate, at least in its general outlines, and that it embodies stylistic features of the 5th century BCE; the evidence for its identification with Pheidias's Athena Lemnia, however, is much less convincing and by no means universally accepted. In the opinions of some scholars, other Roman statues are more likely to reflect the appearance of the Lemnia: Evelyn Harrison, for example, has described the so-called Athena Medici type as "by far the best candidate for the Lemnian Athena of Pheidias". Other identifications have also been proposed for the Dresden–Bologna type reconstructed by Furtwängler: J. P. Barron thought that it might be derived from the Pheidian victory monument set up at Delphi after the Battle of Marathon, and Harrison tentatively suggested an association with Alkamenes, a younger contemporary of Pheidias, rather than Pheidias himself.
