= Felsina =

Scientific classification
- Kingdom: Animalia
- Phylum: Arthropoda
- Subphylum: Chelicerata
- Class: Arachnida
- Order: Araneae
- Infraorder: Araneomorphae
- Family: Thomisidae
- Genus: Felsina; Simon, 1895
- Species: F. granulum

Binomial name
- Felsina granulum Simon, 1895

Monotypic genus of spiders

Felsina is a monotypic genus of African crab spiders containing the single species, Felsina granulum. It was first described by Eugène Louis Simon in 1895, and is found in Africa.

== See also ==
- List of Thomisidae species
