= Phidias =

Greek sculptor, painter and architect (c.480–430 BC)

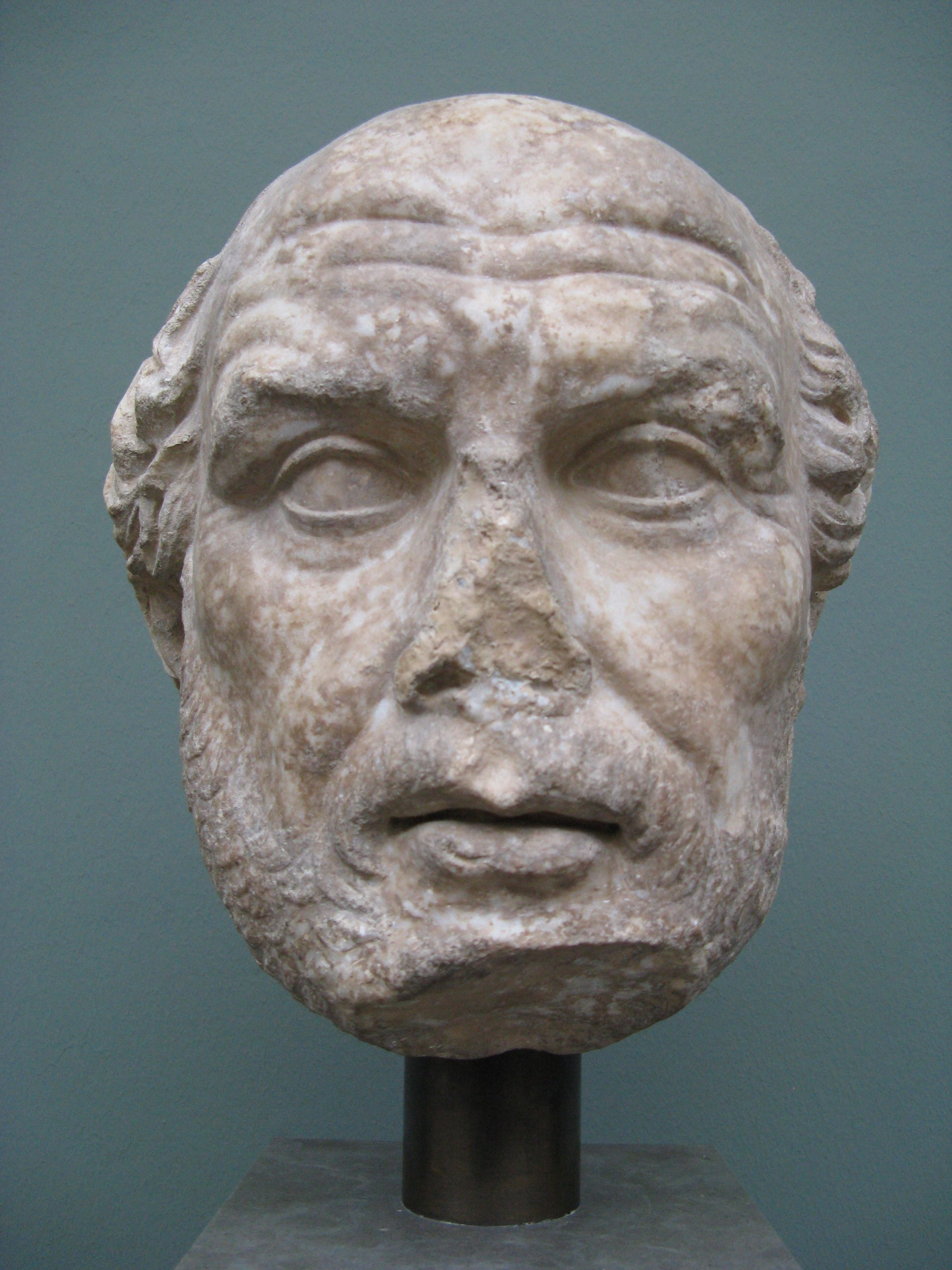
- Bust of Phidias (Roman copy of a 3rd century BC Greek original)
- Born: c. 480 BC
- Died: c. 430 BC
- Notable work: Athena Parthenos; Athena Promachos; Elgin Marbles

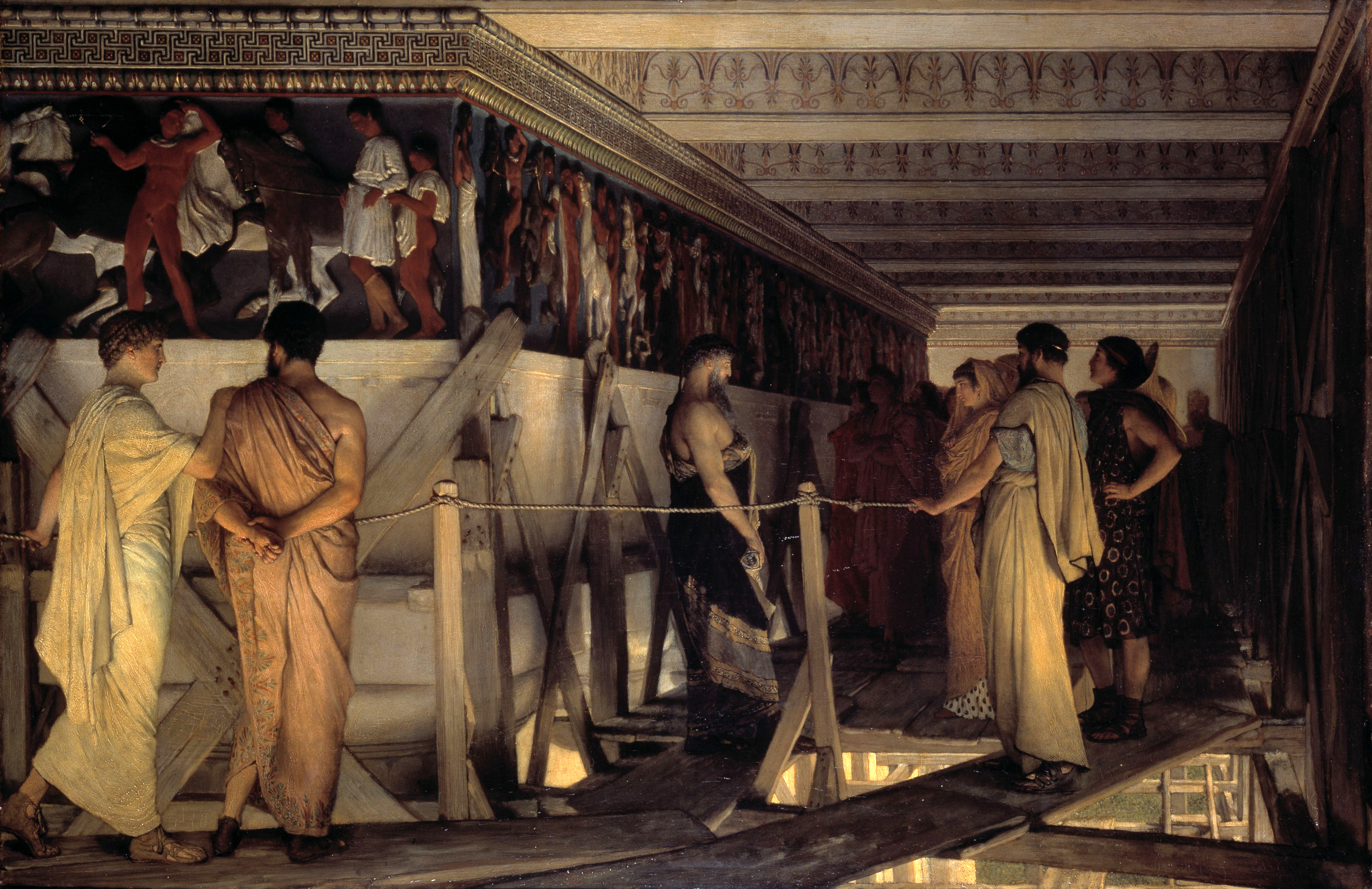
Phidias Showing the Frieze of the Parthenon to his Friends (1868) by Sir Lawrence Alma-Tadema

Phidias or Pheidias (/ˈfɪdiəs/; Ancient Greek: Φειδίας, Pheidias; c. 480 – c. 430 BC) was an Ancient Greek sculptor, painter, and architect, active in the 5th century BC. His Statue of Zeus at Olympia was one of the Seven Wonders of the Ancient World. Phidias also designed the statues of the goddess Athena on the Athenian Acropolis, namely the Athena Parthenos inside the Parthenon, and the Athena Promachos, a colossal bronze which stood between it and the Propylaea, a monumental gateway that served as the entrance to the Acropolis in Athens. Phidias was the son of Charmides of Athens. The ancients believed that his masters were Hegias and Ageladas.

Plutarch discusses Phidias's friendship with the Greek statesman Pericles, recording that enemies of Pericles tried to attack him through Phidias – who was accused of stealing gold intended for the Parthenon's statue of Athena, and of impiously portraying himself and Pericles on the shield of the statue. The historical value of this account, as well as the legend about accusations against the 'Periclean circle', is debatable, but Aristophanes mentions an incident with Phidias around that time.

Phidias is often credited as the main instigator of the Classical Greek sculptural design. Today, most critics and historians consider him one of the greatest of all ancient Greek sculptors.

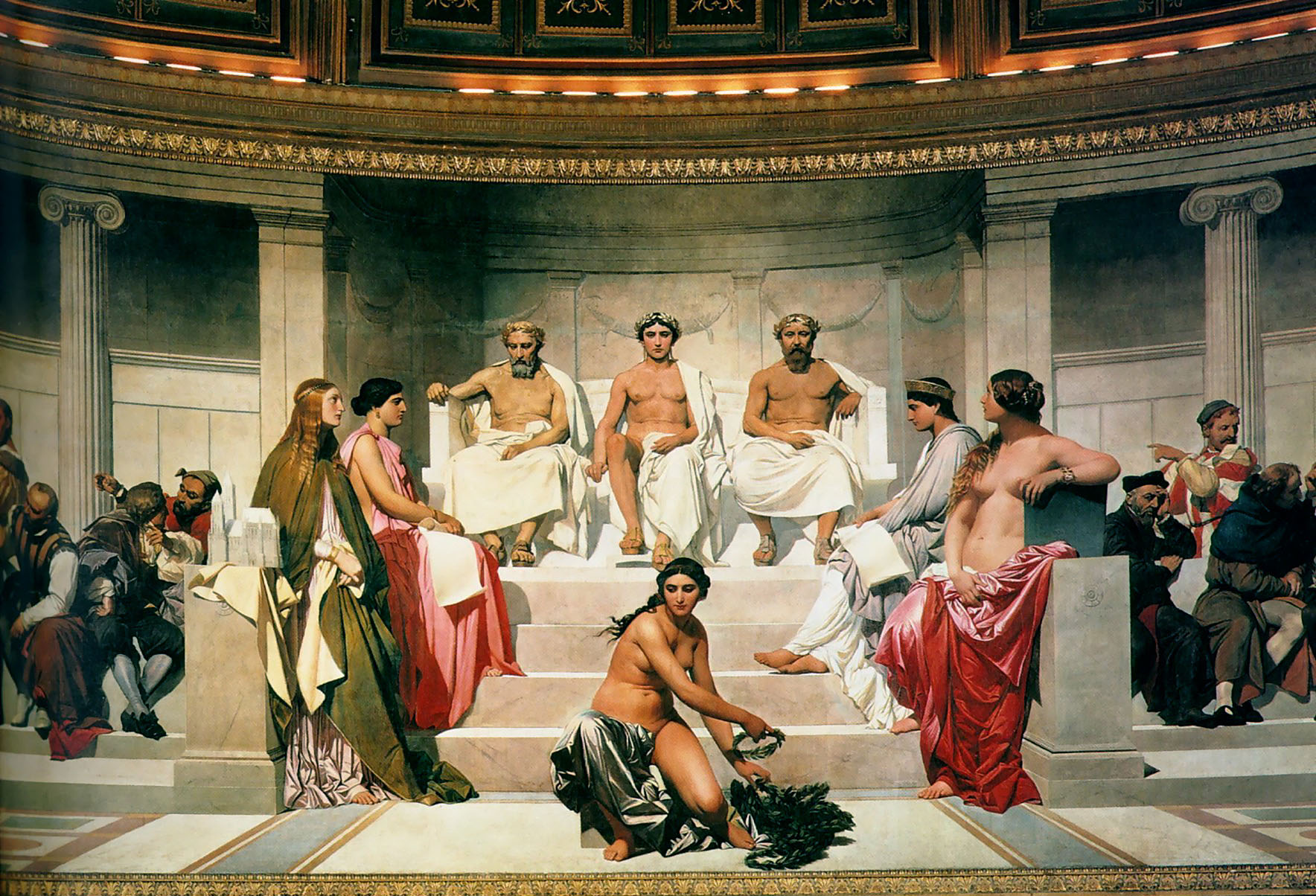
In this 1841–42 painting by Paul Delaroche, Phidias is depicted enthroned on the right.

== Life and work ==
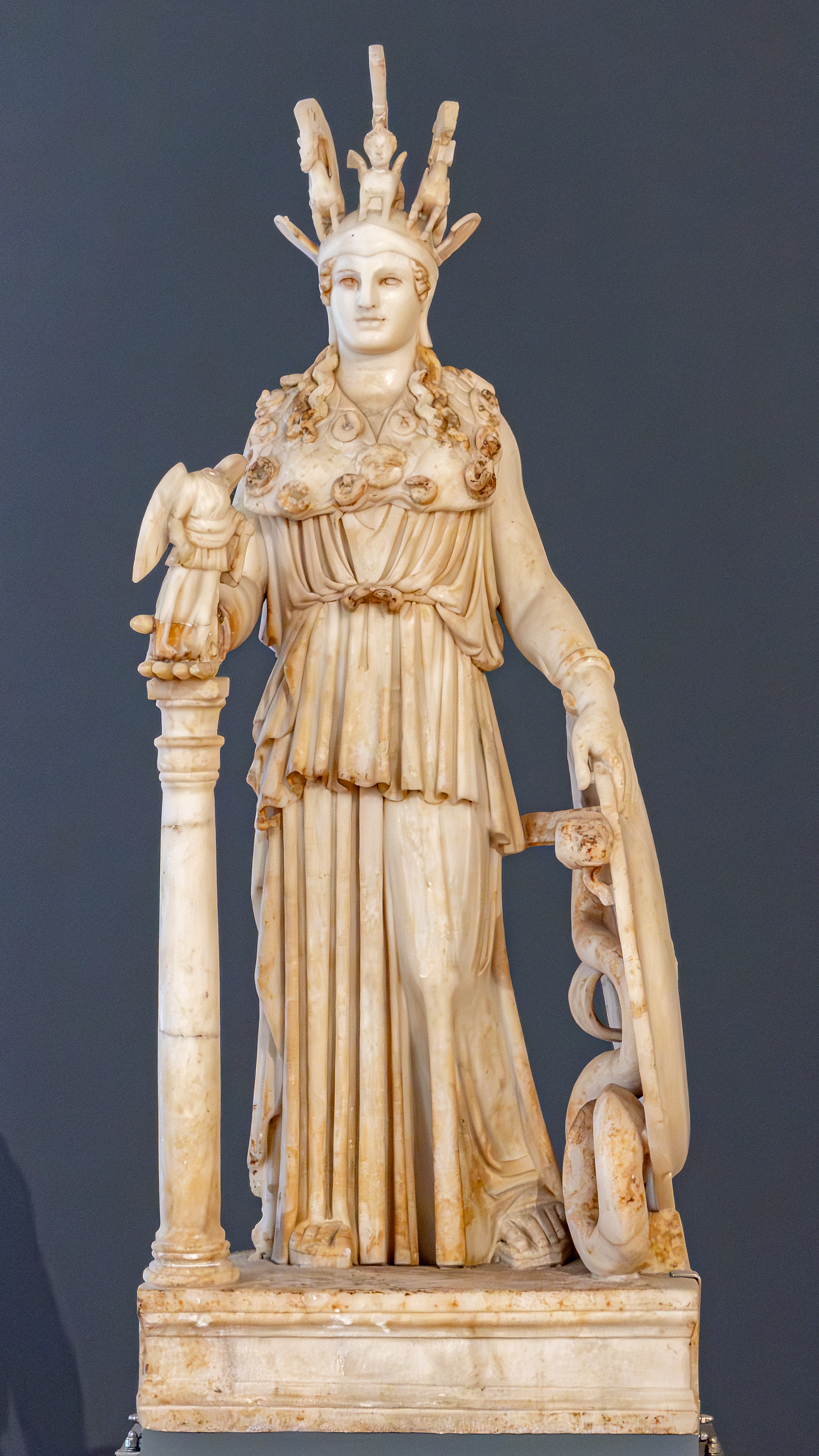
The Varvakeion Athena, a Roman-era statue of Athena Parthenos considered to be the most faithful reproduction of the chryselephantine statue made by Phidias and his assistants, displayed in the National Archaeological Museum, Athens

Of Phidias's life, little is known apart from his works. Although no original works exist that can be attributed to him with certainty, numerous Roman copies of varying degrees of fidelity are known to exist.

The earliest of Phidias's works were dedications in memory of Marathon, celebrating the Greek victory. His first commission was a group of national heroes with Miltiades as a central figure. At Delphi he created a great group in bronze including the figures of Greek gods Apollo and Athena, several Attic heroes, and General Miltiades the Younger. On the Acropolis of Athens, Phidias constructed a colossal bronze statue of Athena, the Athena Promachos, which was visible far out at sea. Athena was the goddess of wisdom and warriors and the protector of Athens. At Pellene in Achaea, and at Plataea, Phidias made two other statues of Athena, as well as a statue of the goddess Aphrodite in ivory and gold for the people of Elis.

In antiquity, Phidias was celebrated for his statues in bronze and his chryselephantine works (statues made of gold and ivory). In the Hippias Major, Plato claims that Phidias seldom, if ever, executed works in marble unlike many sculptors of his time. Plutarch writes that he superintended the great works ordered by Greek statesman Pericles on the Acropolis. Ancient critics take a very high view of the merits of Phidias. They especially praise the ethos or permanent moral level of his works as compared with those of the later so called "pathetic" school. Both Pausanias and Plutarch mention works of his depicting the warlike Athena Areia. Demetrius calls his statues sublime, and at the same time precise.

In 447 BC, Pericles commissioned several sculptures for Athens from Phidias to celebrate the Greek victory against the Persians at the Battle of Marathon during the Greco-Persian Wars (490 BC). Pericles used some of the money from the maritime League of Delos, to rebuild and decorate Athens to celebrate this victory. Inscriptions prove that the marble blocks intended for the pedimental statues of the Parthenon were not brought to Athens until 433–434 BC. It is therefore possible that most of sculptural decoration of the Parthenon was the work of Phidias's workshop including pupils such as Alcamenes and Agoracritus.

According to Pausanias (1.28.2), the original bronze Athena Lemnia was created by Phidias (c. 450–440 BC) for Athenians living on Lemnos. He described it as "the best of all Pheidias's works to see". Adolf Furtwängler suggested that he found a copy of the Athena Lemnia in a statue of which the head is located in Bologna and the body is at Dresden. Some 5th-century BC torsos of Athena have been found at Athens. The torso of Athena in the École des Beaux-Arts at Paris, which has lost its head, gives some idea of what the original statue may have looked like.

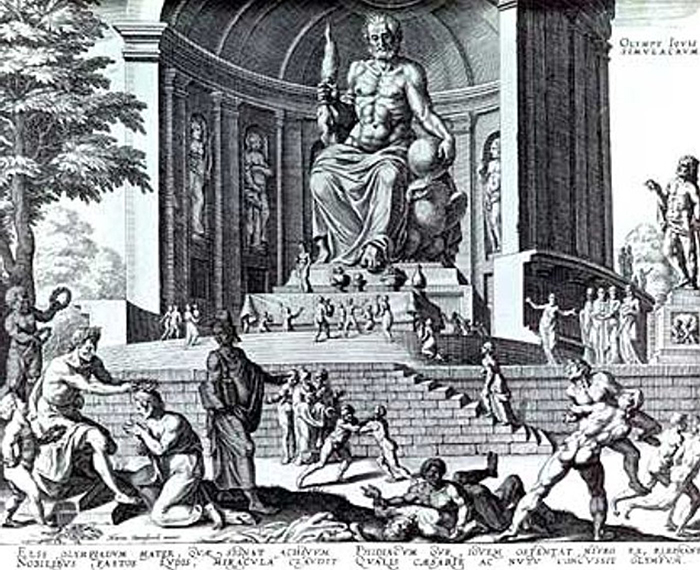
A reconstruction of Phidias's Statue of Zeus at Olympia in an engraving made by Philippe Galle in 1572, from a drawing by Maarten van Heemskerck

For the ancient Greeks, two works of Phidias far outshone all others: the colossal chryselephantine Statue of Zeus (c. 432 BC), which was erected in the Temple of Zeus at Olympia, and the Athena Parthenos (lit. 'Athena the Virgin'), a sculpture of the virgin goddess Athena, which was housed in the Parthenon in Athens. Both sculptures belong to about the middle of the 5th century BC. A number of replicas and works inspired by it, both ancient and modern, have been made. Upon completing the Athena Parthenos, Phidias was accused of embezzlement. Specifically, he was charged with shortchanging the amount of gold that was supposed to be used for the statue and keeping the extra for himself. It seems that the charge was politically motivated – a result of his friendship with Pericles, who had many enemies in Athens.

Phidias supposedly weighed the gold robe of the Athena Parthenos to prove his innocence, but was then accused of impiously portraying himself and Pericles on the shield of the statue, which was apparently true.

Plutarch records that Phidias was imprisoned and died in jail. (Note: According to Plutarch, Phidias was made an object of attack by the political enemies of Pericles. His workman Menon is said to have been at least partially responsible for his downfall: Plutarch states that Menon sat in the marketplace begging for protection in exchange for bringing charges against Phidias. He was subsequently provided with safety by the state and exempted from public duties. Accordingly, Phidias was imprisoned and died in prison at Athens.)

Aristophanes's play Peace (c. 421 BC) mentions an unfortunate incident involving Phidias, but little context is provided.

According to Philochorus, as quoted by a scholiast on Aristophanes, Phidias was put to death by the Eleans after he completed the Statue of Zeus at Olympia for them. From the late 5th century BC, small copies of the statue of Zeus were found on coins from Elis, which give a general notion of the pose and the character of the head. The god was seated on a throne, every part of which was used for sculptural decoration. His body was of ivory, his robe of gold. His head was of a somewhat archaic type; the bust of Zeus found at Otricoli, which used to be regarded as a copy of the head of the Olympian statue, is certainly more than a century later in style.

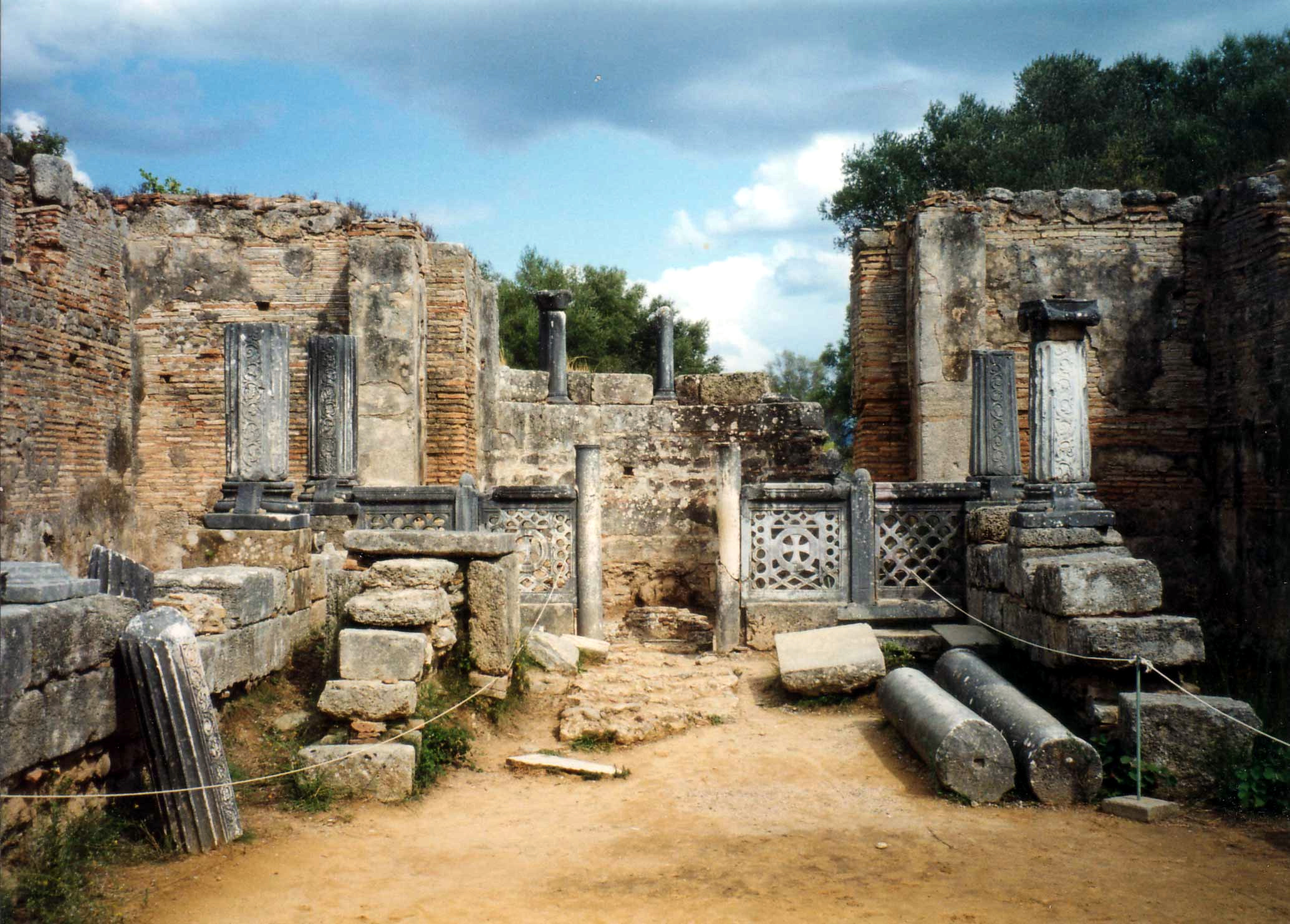
The workshop of Phidias at Olympia (2005)

== Archaeological discovery ==
A significant advancement in the knowledge of Phidias's working methodology came during 1954–1958 with the excavation of the workshop at Olympia where he created the Statue of Zeus. Tools, terracotta molds and pottery were found, just where Pausanias said the statue was constructed. An important find was a cup inscribed on the bottom "Φειδίου εἰμί" (Pheidíou eimí) – "I belong to Phidias"; literally: "of Phidias I am", although the inscription's authenticity is disputed. The discovery has enabled archaeologists to re-create the techniques used to make the statue.

Another probable workshop of Phidias, on the southern slope of the Acropolis, was excavated in 1878, 1963-1964 and from 2001 onwards and seems to belong to the Athena Promachos.

== Legacy ==
By 1910, mathematician Mark Barr began using the Greek letter Phi (φ) as a symbol for the golden ratio after Phidias. However, Barr later wrote that he thought it unlikely that Phidias actually used the golden ratio. In astronomy, his name is used for the Phidias crater on Mercury and a main-belt asteroid named 4753 Phidias.

== Gallery ==
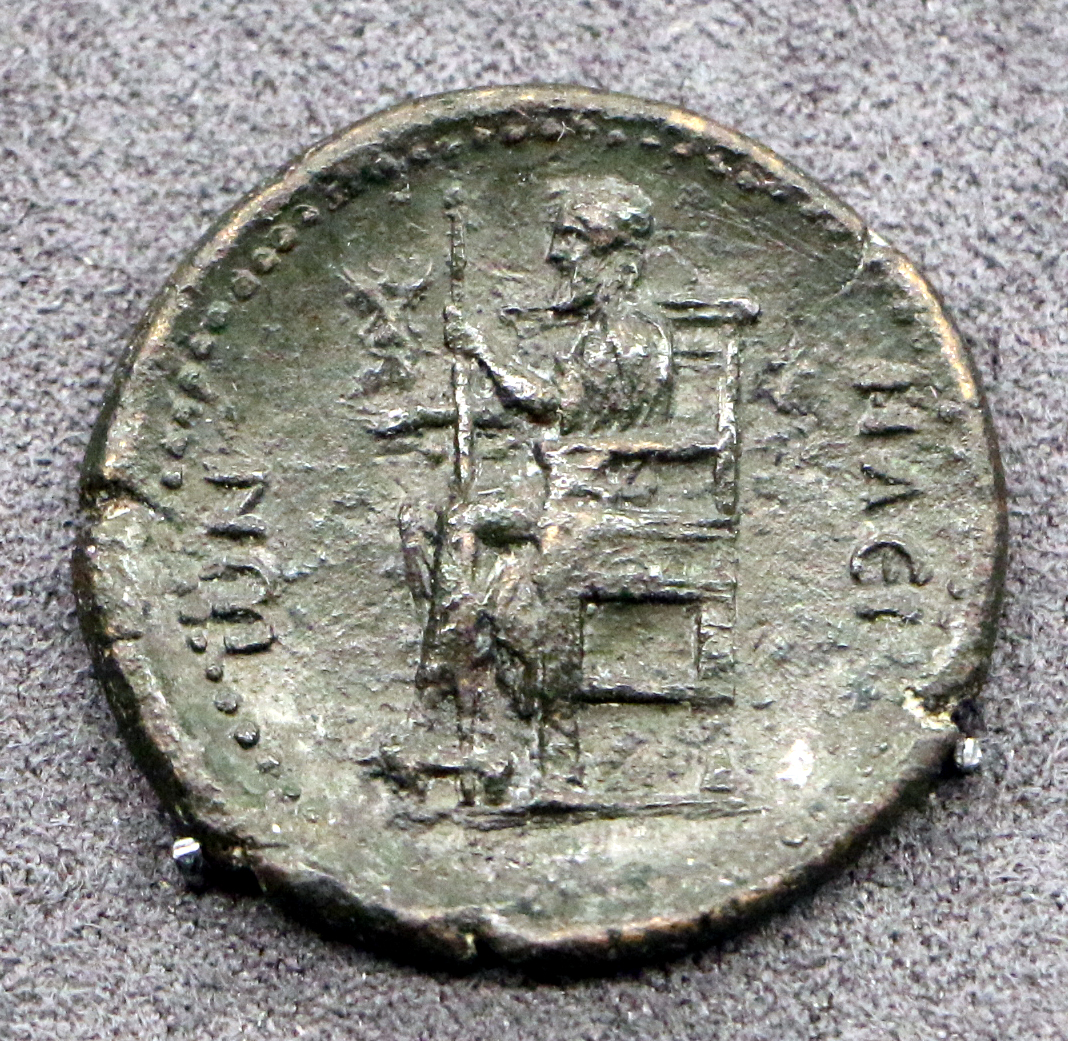
Reverse of a Roman Provincial coin from Elis minted by Hadrian which depicts the Statue of Zeus

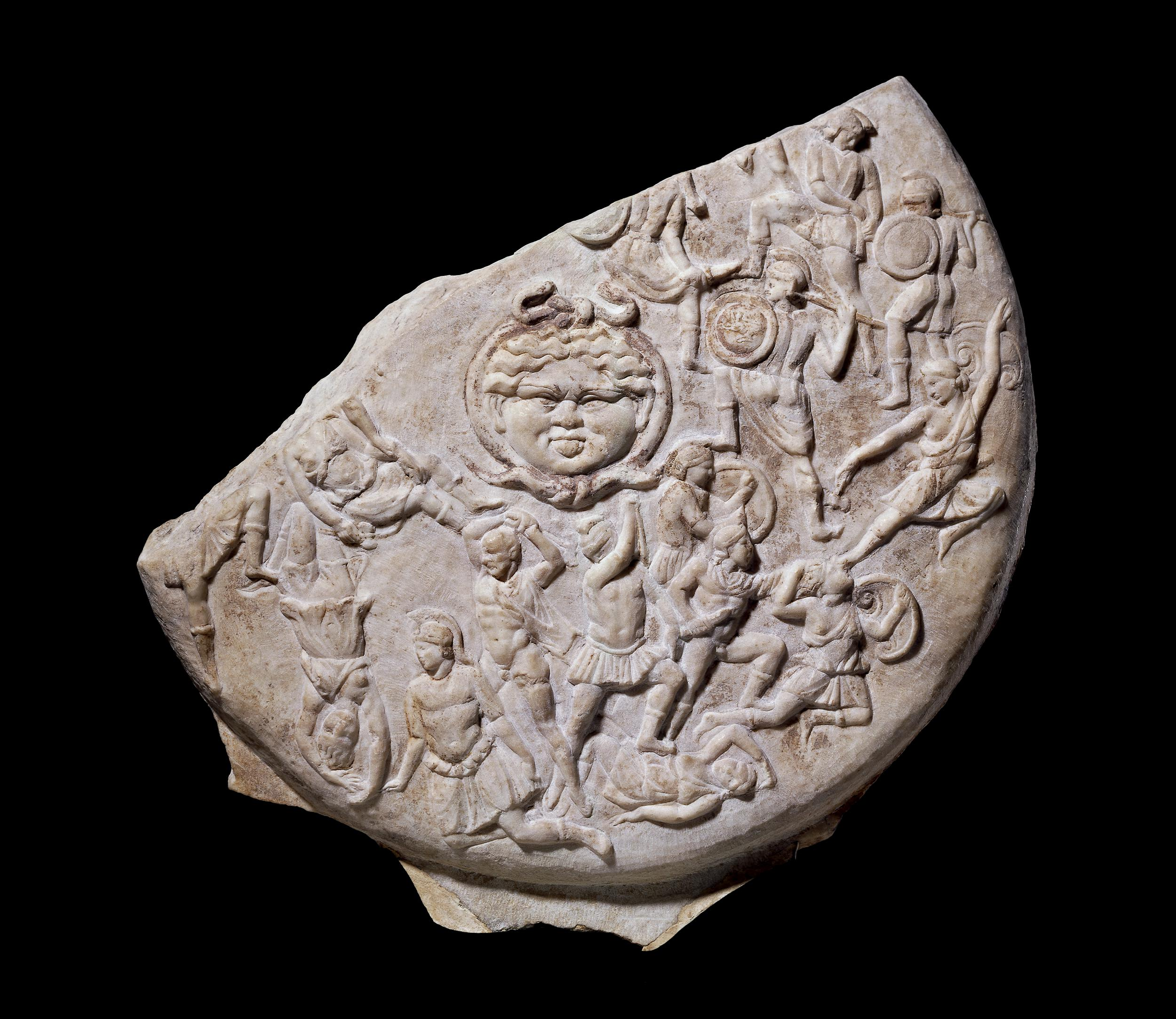
The Strangford Shield, a Roman copy of the shield of the Athena Parthenos; below the gorgon head are portraits of Phidias and Pericles

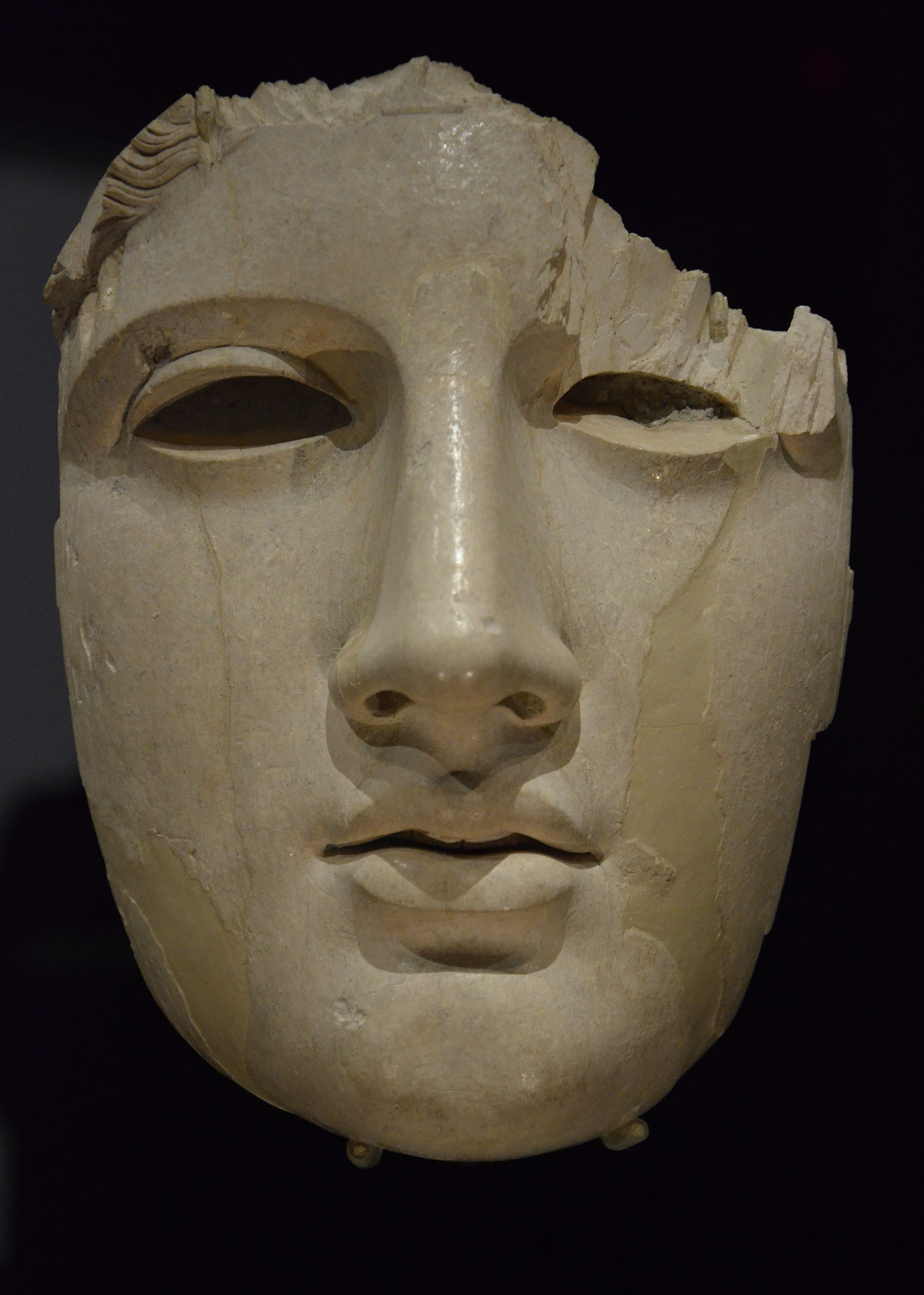
Ivory head of Apollo, perhaps carved by Phidias, looted in 1995 by Pietro Casasanta and repatriated to Italy in 2003

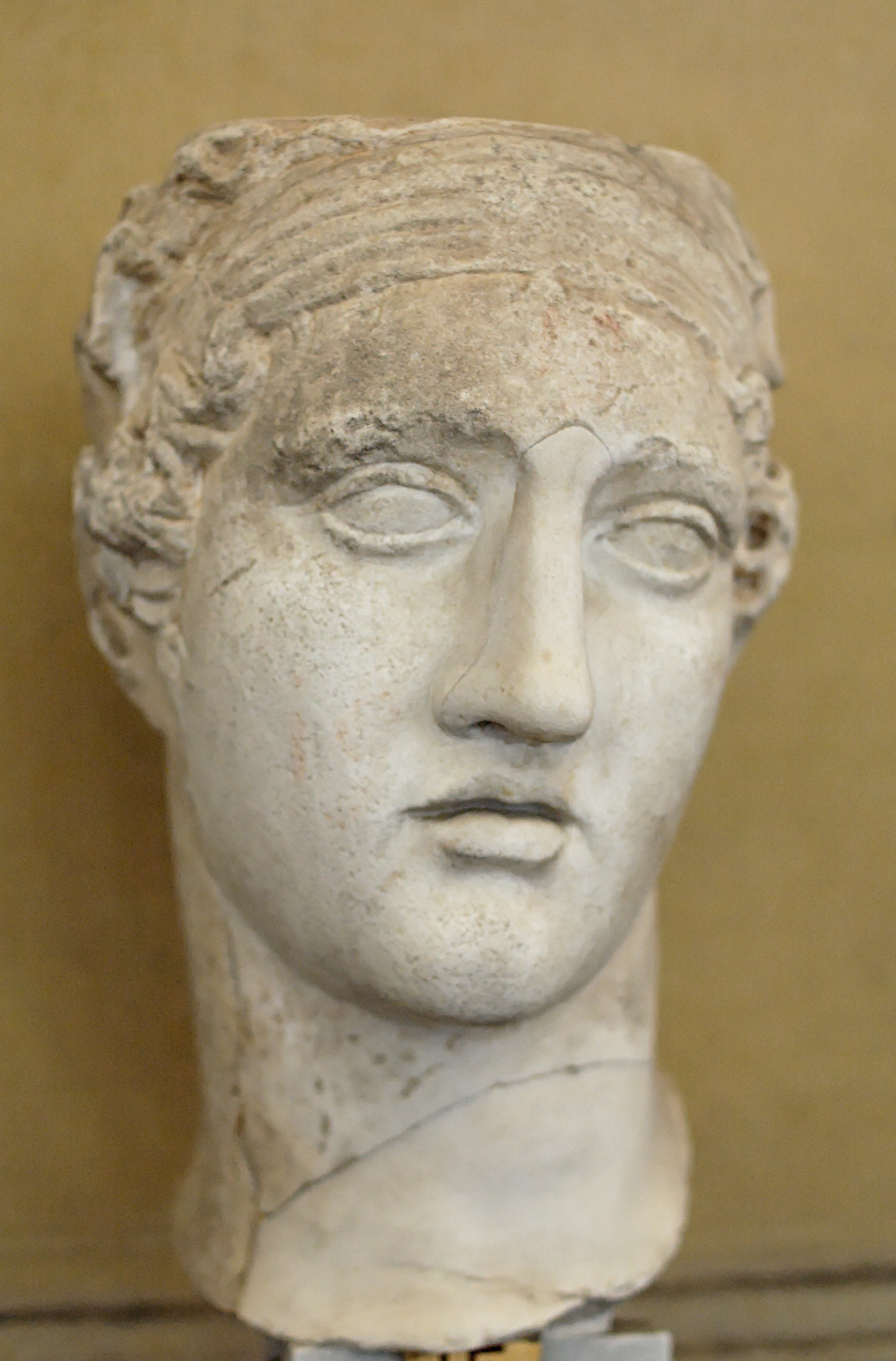
Head of Aphrodite. Phidian style

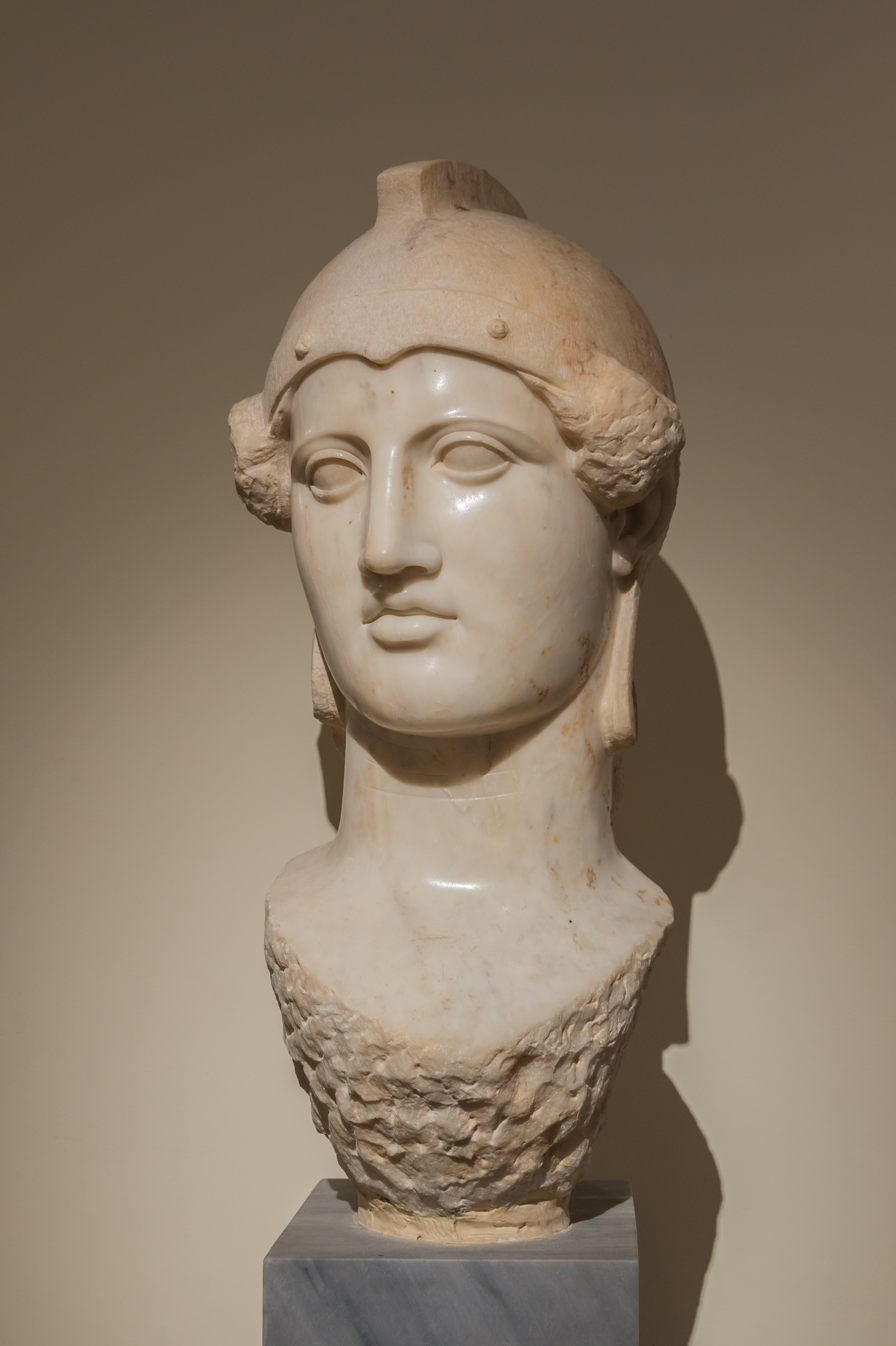
Head of Athena, a copy of a work by Phidias or one of his pupils found around Pnyx, now in the National Archeological Museum of Athens

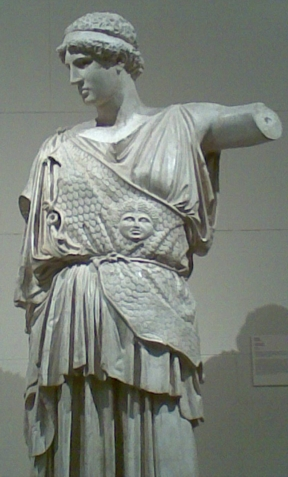
Reconstruction of the Athena Lemnia, Dresden

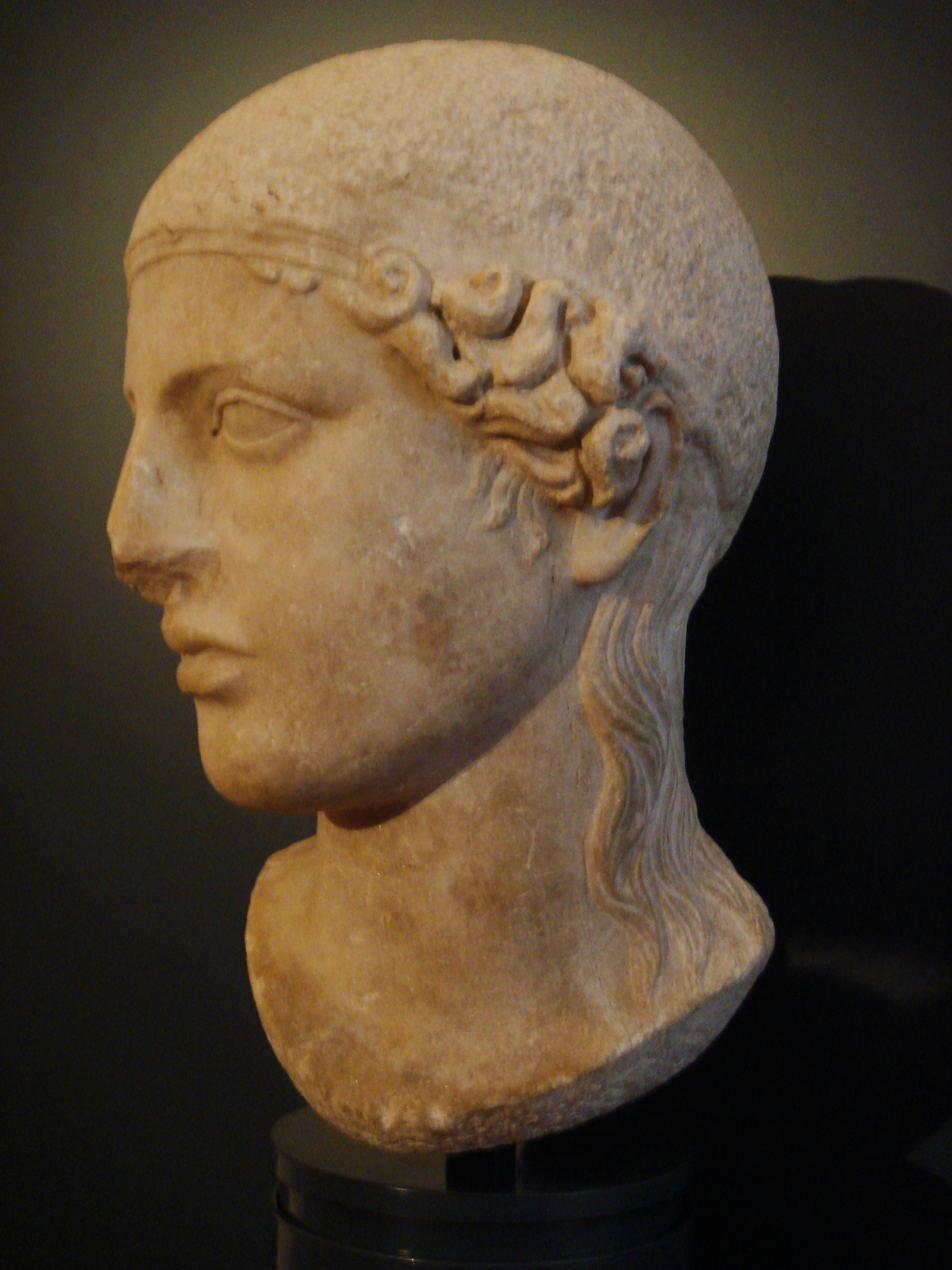
Head of Athena, Roman copy

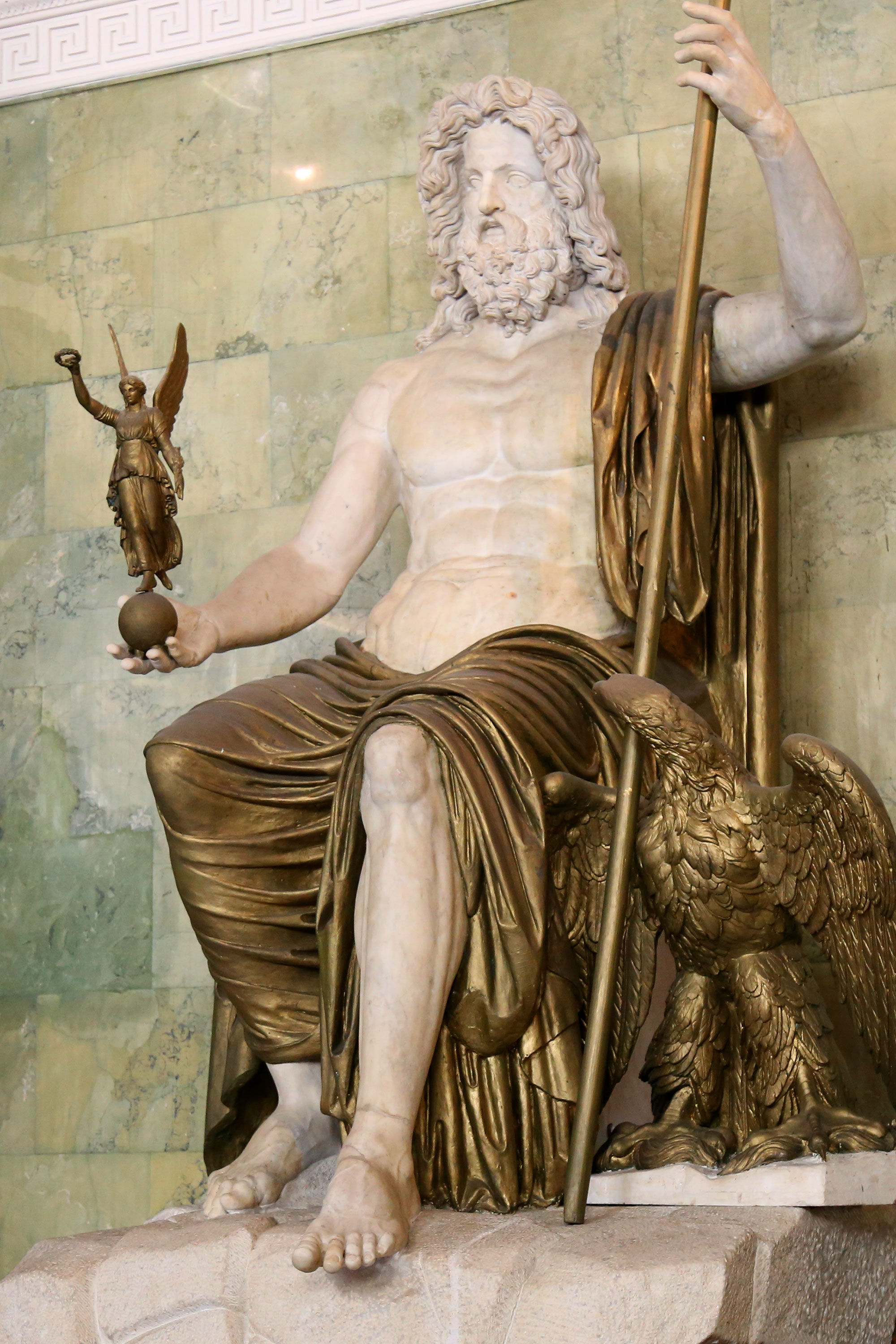
Statue of Jupiter (Hermitage), a Roman copy of Statue of Zeus at Olympia

== See also ==
- Ancient Greek sculpture
- Pediments of the Parthenon
