= Athena Parthenos =

Sculpture of the Greek goddess Athena

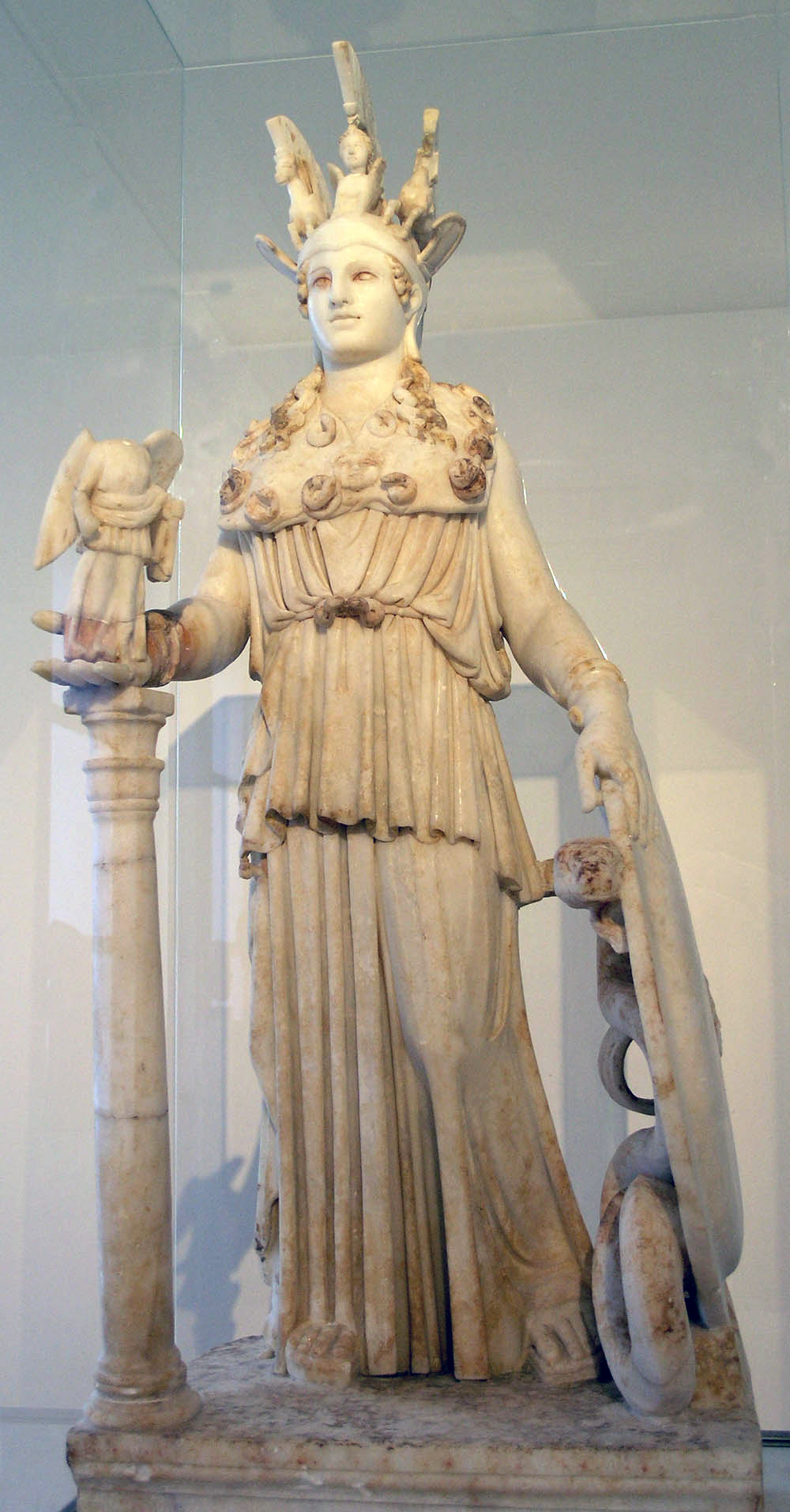
The Varvakeion Athena reflects the type of the restored Athena Parthenos: Roman period, 2nd century CE (National Archaeological Museum of Athens).

The statue of Athena Parthenos (Note: The earliest known references to Pheidias's statue date from the 5th century BCE, and refer to it generically as the statue, the image or the goddess, IG I^{3} 453-460. The earliest use of the epithet "Parthenos" was in the late 4th or the early 3rd c by Philippides, in a passage preserved by Plutarch, (Dem. 26). See C. Cullen Davison, Pheidias: The Sculptures and Ancient Sources, Vol. 1, Oxford, 2009, pp.69-70.) (Ancient Greek: Παρθένος Ἀθηνᾶ, lit. 'Athena the Virgin') was a monumental chryselephantine sculpture of the goddess Athena. Attributed to Phidias and dated to the mid-fifth century BCE, it was an offering from the city of Athens to Athena, its tutelary deity. The naos of the Parthenon on the acropolis of Athens was designed exclusively to accommodate it.

Many artists and craftsmen worked on the realization of the sculpture, which was probably built around a core of cypress wood, and then paneled with gold and ivory plates. At about 13 meters high (42 ft), the statue reflected the established aesthetic canon of the severe style (clothing) while adopting the innovations of the high classical (leg position). She was helmeted and held a large round shield and spear, placed on the ground to her left, next to her sacred snake. Clothes, jewellery, accessories, and even the statue base were decorated, mainly with the snake and gorgon motif.

The statue was lost at an unknown date sometime in the first millennium. Several replicas and works were inspired by the original.

== Parthenon and statue of Athena ==
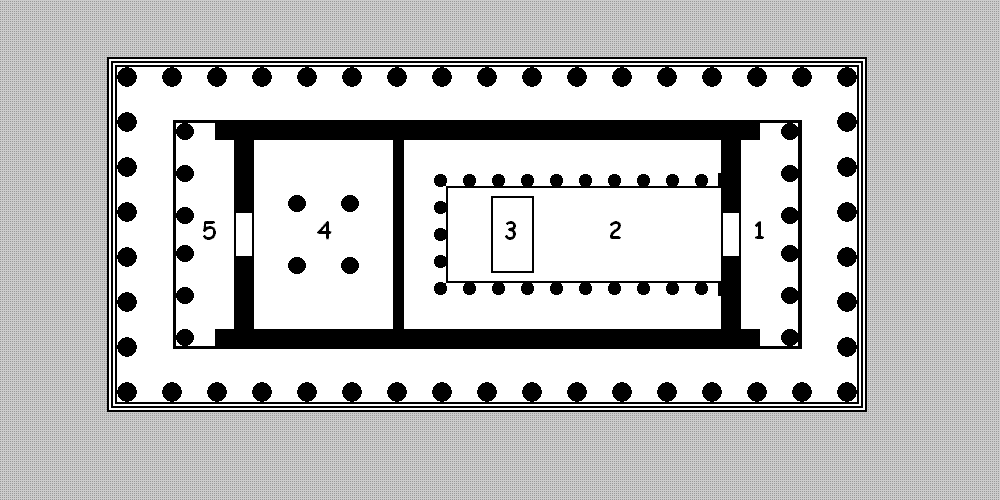
Plan of the Parthenon: 1) Pronaos (east side) 2) Naos hecatompedos neos (east side) 3) Chryselephantine statue of Athena Parthenos 4) Parthenon (virgin room, treasure) (west side) 5) Opisthodomos (west side)

In 480 BCE, the Persians ransacked the Acropolis of Athens, including the pre-Parthenon, which was under construction at the time. After their victories in Salamis and Plataea, the Athenians had sworn not to complete the destroyed temples but to leave them as they were, in memory of the Persian "barbarism". In the succeeding years, however, Athens grew to control much of the region through its domination of the Delian League, a confederation of Greek states originally designed to protect themselves against the Persians. Within 30 years, the league had evolved into an Athenian powerhouse. By 454 BCE, the Delian treasury had been relocated to Athens, where the money was funnelled into an ambitious plan to rebuild the city and its destroyed temples, including the Parthenon.

The new Parthenon was erected between 447 and 438 BCE. Pericles chose the sculptor Phidias to supervise the building program with the architects Ictinos and Kallikrates. The sekos (closed part surrounded by the peristyle) was divided into two rooms. The small one to the west, the "Parthenon" itself (the "virgin room"), housed the treasure of the League of Delos and other offerings. To the east, the "hecatompedos neos" (Note: The "hundred-foot" sanctuary (neos being the archaic form of naos) is a reference to the Archaic Temple of Athena.) housed the statue of Athena Parthenos. The room was 29.90 m long, or around one hundred Athenian feet, by 19 m wide, with a ceiling height of 12.50 m.

The new building was not intended to become a temple, but a treasury meant to house the colossal chryselephantine statue of Athena Parthenos. It is even likely that the statue project preceded the building project. This was an offering from the city to the goddess, but not a statue of worship: there was no priestess of Athena Parthenos.

Primary ancient sources about the statue are writings by Pausanias (Note: Pausanias, Description of Greece, I, 24, 5-8) and Pliny the Elder. (Note: Natural History, XXXVI, 16-19) Pausanias is also the originator of the surname "Parthenos." Early writings mentioned "the statue", "the statue of Athena", "the golden statue of Athena", "the ivory statue of Athena", or simply "the Athena." Since at least the end of the fifth century BCE, however, the patron goddess of the Parthenon has been known as "Athena Parthenos."

== Construction ==
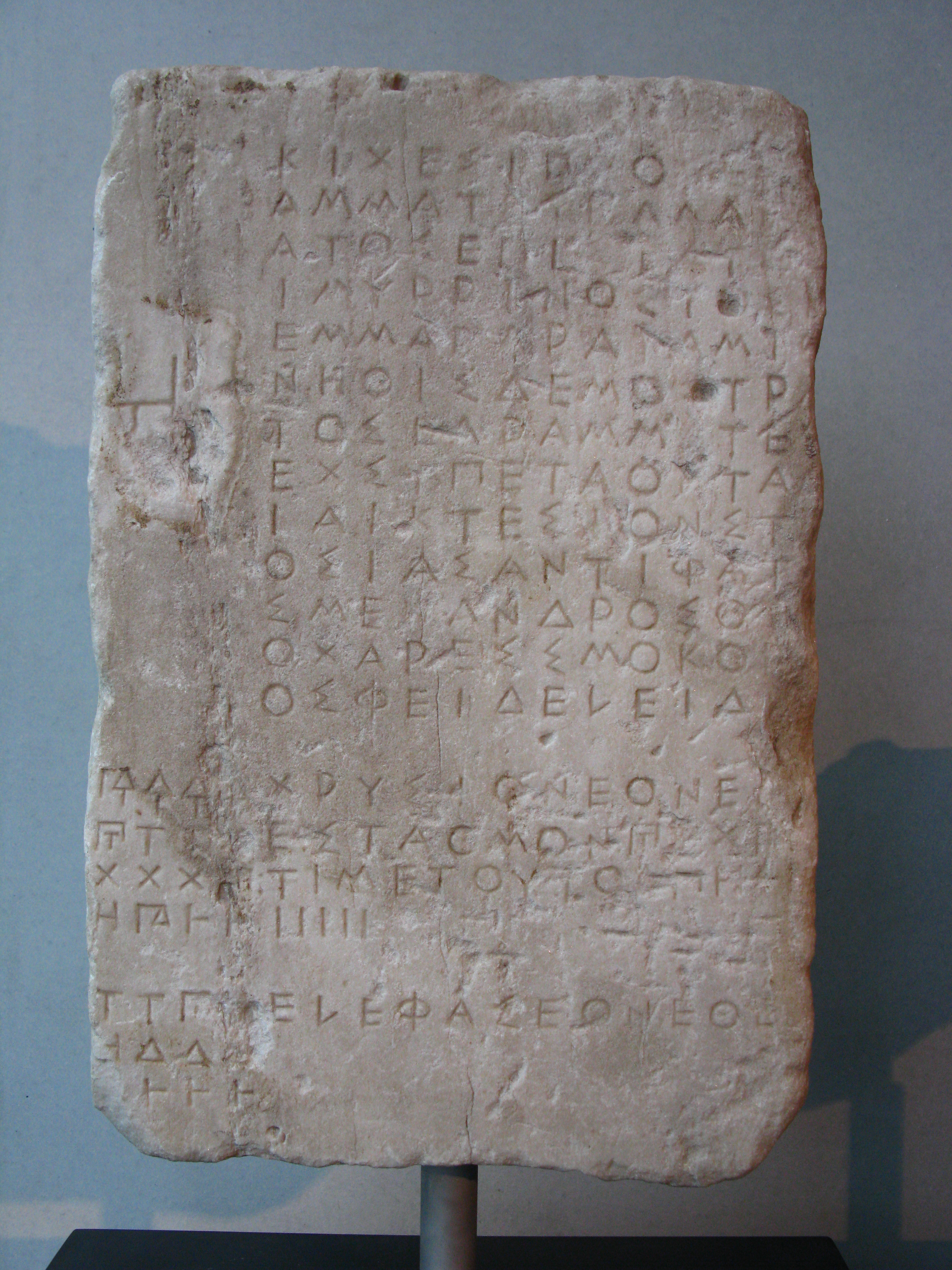
Fragment of the accounts relating to the realization of the statue of Athena Parthenos, IG I^{3} 458, Museum of the Acropolis of Athens.

According to Pausanias and Plutarch, (Note: In his Life of Pericles, Plutarch specifies, however, that the name of Phidias is engraved on the basis of the statue.) the statue is not by Phidias alone but of a team of craftsmen representing several trades, Phidias supervising all the decoration work of the Parthenon. The location of the workshop where the statue was made is unknown. It could have been on the acropolis, at the eastern end, under what was later to become the old Acropolis museum. However, given the cost of precious materials (gold and ivory), it could also have been installed elsewhere, at the foot of the sacred rock, far from the comings and goings of the main site and its dust.

The statue was likely made of "spare parts", perhaps first mounted in the workshop, then dismantled, moved to the Parthenon, after its completion, and installed in its final place. The remaining accounts make it possible to estimate the cost of the work at 704 talents, or the equivalent of 200 Triremes (the city's naval power base). However, the statue was considered an ultimate financial reserve, the gold decorating it could be melted down if necessary. According to the various ancient authors, (Note: Thucydides and Plutarch state 40 talents, Ephorus of Cyme covered by Diodorus of Sicily rather say 50 talents and Philochorus is very precise with 44 talents. (Lapatin 2005, p. 270).) the weight of gold used was between 40 and 50 talents, or between 1 and 1.3 tons of gold. By way of comparison, the annual toll of the "allies" of the League of Delos at the time amounted to 28 talents. On another note, this gold would have represented for the city of Athens more than a year's salary for 10,000 skilled workers, more than a year's pay for 10,000 hoplites or 10,000 rowers in the war fleet. The quantity and cost of ivory are more difficult to determine. It was needed for the face, arms, and feet of the statue, as well as for the gorgon's head depicted on the goddess's chest. It is less certain that ivory could have been used for the rendering of snake scales. On an inscription of 440-439 BCE there is recorded the purchase of an unknown amount of elephant ivory for the sum of 24 talents and 743 silver drachmas. However, it is difficult to know if this constituted all the necessary material.

The statue was mounted on a rot-proof wooden frame, probably cypress. A decree of the Athenians thanks the people of the Eteocarpathians for providing them with a large quantity of cypress wood. This wood came from a forest dedicated to Apollo and therefore could only be exploited for religious purposes. In the Parthenon's soil is still visible the hole (75.5 cm by 54 cm and 37 cm deep) where the central beam was planted. Around this "mast", a whole frame in the same cypress wood gave shape to the statue. The city had the technique and craftsmen capable of this work with its many marine carpenters. To this reinforcement were fixed, probably nailed, gold plates. It is not possible to know if they had been melted (and the moulds preserved, perhaps in case of repair) or hammered (Sphyrelaton technique). Ivory work was much more difficult, even if the statue of Athena Parthenos was not the first Greek statue to use this imported material. Oppian gives valuable indications of the techniques used. The necessary surfaces (face, arms, and feet) far exceeded the size of elephant tusks. However, these are made up of thin layers of superimposed ivory that can be "unrolled like a roll of papyrus". The next problem was to give shape to these long blades. It was the work of specialists able to soften the material and then mould it. (Note: Ancient authors propose various techniques. Pausanias describes heating. Plutarch talks about soaking in beer. Dioscorides suggests boiling for six hours in a mandrake decoction. In the 12th century, Theophilus, in his Lumen Animae, listed five different techniques: boil in wine, soak in oil, coat in skin, heat and finally soak in vinegar. Recent experiences have shown that the technique of soaking in vinegar works. (Lapatin 2005, p.276-277).) The ivory plates thus created had the flexibility of the wax plates used for moulding bronze statues, a technique that Phidias mastered perfectly. If the gold plates were probably directly nailed to the frame, the more fragile ivory was certainly fixed more delicately with dowels or glued with fish glue. (Note: This was the case for the gates of the temple of Asclepias in Aegina for which accounts were kept. (Lapatin 2005, p. 278).) The joints between ivory plates would most certainly have been masked in the drop shadows and by jewellery (bracelets and necklace). The ivory then had to be polished, most often with squatine skins (type of shark). Finally, the ivory was painted: the goddess was "made-up", using red pigment on her cheeks and lips as well as on her nails. It is also very unlikely that the gold was left as is; it would likely have been inlaid with precious and semi-precious stones that reflected the light.

The statue must have been completed in 438 BCE when it was consecrated and installed in the Parthenon. Gold and ivory that had not been used were then offered for sale.

== Description ==
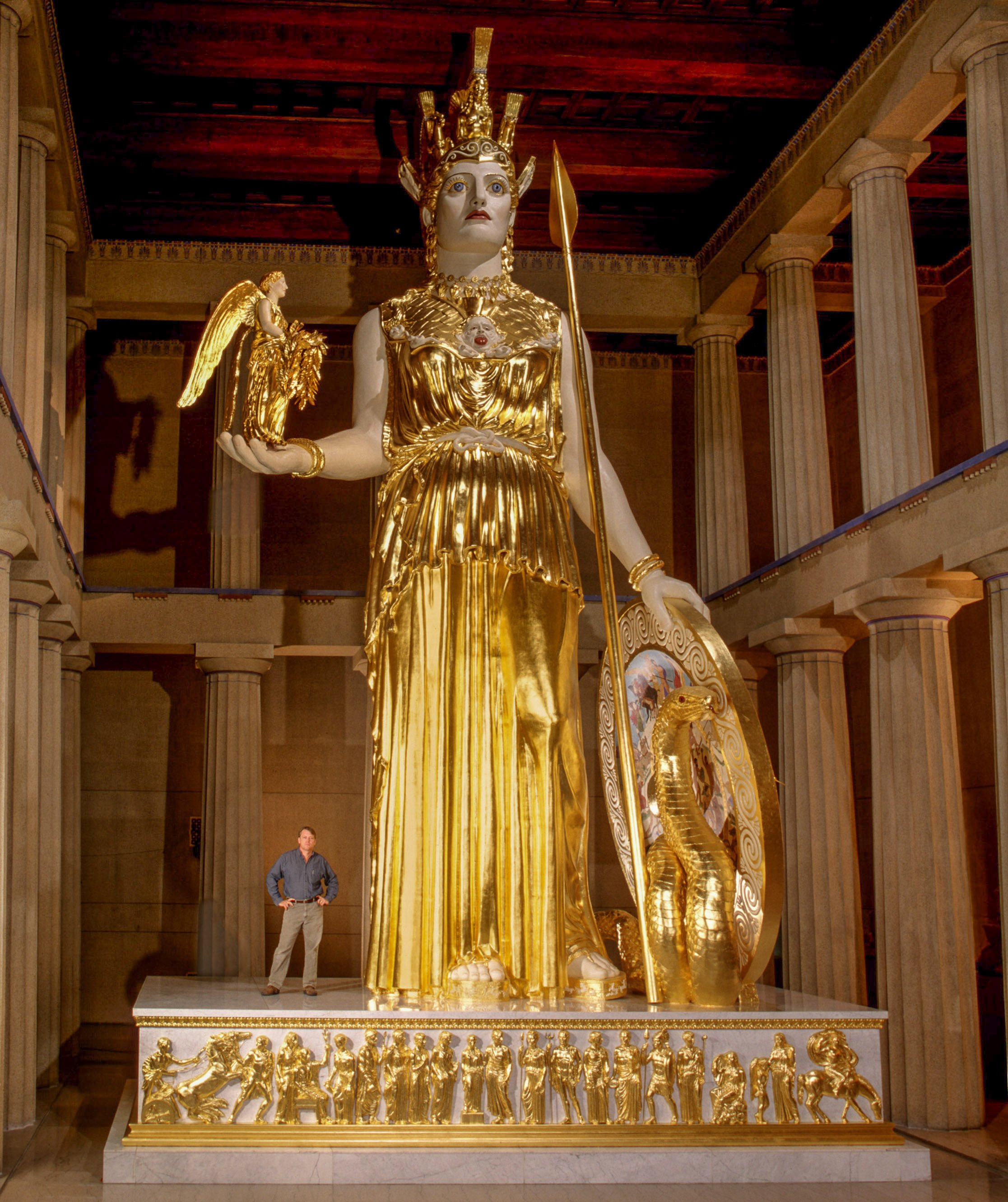
Rendition of the chryselephantine statue of Athena Parthenos by Alan LeQuire (1990), located in the Parthenon's replica, Centennial Park (Nashville)

The statue was installed in the main room of the Parthenon to the east. Behind her and on her sides, Doric columns supported the roof and offered her the setting of a canopy. In front of her, a large basin filled with water played several roles: it was used to maintain a sufficient degree of humidity in the room (to conserve ivory) and it also had to reflect the external light and illuminate the work. It was suggested that there could have been windows (probably 3 m high and 2.5 m wide) on each side of the door (9.75 m high and 4.19 m wide) that would have allowed daylight in.

According to Pliny the Elder, the statue measured 26 cubits (about 11.50 m) in height, probably including the base. Thus it would have risen within one and a half meters from the ceiling, filling the room with the divine presence. Phidias' idea was apparently to represent the goddess under her "true" aspect, in all her majesty, beauty, magnificence, and size, since the gods were considered to be much taller than humans.

Only the pedestal of the statue has been preserved. It is a parallelepiped in poros measuring 8.065 by 4.10 m (26 ft 5.5 in by 13 ft 5.4 in) and 1.30 to 1.50 m (4 ft 3 in to 4 ft 11 in) high. On the front of this base, a carved plaque evoked the birth of Pandora in the presence of twenty gods. It is the only decorative element that was not subsequently copied and reproduced, so its details are unknown. It is not even possible to know if the plaque was made of marble or gilded bronze. The presence of this theme (birth of the first woman and the first femme fatale) is quite difficult to reconcile with the representation of the virgin goddess of wisdom. It was perhaps a symbol of both aspects of femininity, or even the growing role of women in Athens in the fifth century BCE. Other interpretations have been proposed. Because Helios and Selene framed the scene, it is possible to interpret it as a kind of calendar. But Pandora can also be understood as a warning that, with the gods, nothing is ever taken for granted. (Note: Also recalling the wisdom attributed to Solon to never say of a man that he is happy before he is dead.) On this reading, the triumphant Athens of Pericles has mastered modern techniques, just as the first men mastered fire. But those men had thereby unbalanced the old order and had been punished with the gift of a dangerous woman made by Hephaestus, god of fire and technology. Athens, therefore, had to avoid a similar form of hubris. More optimistically, Pandora's myth could be a reminder that even in dire straits, hope can always be reborn. Finally, far from Pandora described by Hesiod and quoted by Pausanias to evoke the decoration of the base, there is an Athenian Pandora. She is one of the daughters of Erechtheus, one of the Hyacinthides who sacrificed herself to save the city. She would have had a miraculous birth, of the autochthonic type, and was linked to the goddess Athena, mainly by weaving. Pandora was presented in this Athenian myth as a kourotrophic (child carrier therefore a nurse) and a bearer of benefits. From then on, Joan Connelly (Note: Joan B. Connelly, "Parthenon and Parthenoi: A Mythological Interpretation of the Parthenon Frieze", American Journal of Archaeology, vol. 100, no. 1, January 1996, p. 53-80) proposes to read the scene as the apotheosis of Athenian Pandora, and not as the birth of the "Hesiodic" Pandora.

Athena wore a peplos half-open on the right side, as was the rule for female representations in the first half of the fifth century BCE. However, her posture was new (in the canon that Polykleitos would then develop for his athlete statues): the left leg was a little bent, the knee forward, the heel not posing on the ground. This posture seems to have been chosen more for technical reasons of balance and volume of the lower manikin than for aesthetic reasons. The bust, on the other hand, does not seem to have been affected by the imbalance of the lower body, it would have been very straight and frontal.

Over her peplos, she bore at the breast the aegis lined with snakes and within its centre, at the level of the solar plexus, an ivory gorgoneion. The goddess' face was also ivory, probably with a neutral expression, as was then the aesthetic rule. However, she may have had her lips ajar, symbolizing the breath of life. Gemstones allowed her eyes to have the Persian colour corresponding to one of Athena's epithets. (Note: As in the Homeric epithet γλαυκῶπις Ἀθηνᾶ. Iliad 1.206 et passim. Variously translated as Owl-faced, flashing-eyed, and pertinently here grey-eyed. See Susan Deacy, Athena, Routledge, 2008, p.26.) Long strands of hair escaped from her helmet and descended to the aegis. It was a reinterpretation of the korai hairstyle, the archaic statues of young women abundantly dedicated to the goddess on the acropolis of Athens. The helmet was of the Attic type, with paragnathides (pieces protecting the cheeks) raised and decorated with gryphons. The top of the helmet had three crests: a sphinx in the centre, surrounded on each side by a winged horse. The visor was decorated with protomes. The edge of her sandals ("Etruscan" type), about 20 cm high, was decorated with a painted or carved centauromachy, the sources do not allow a conclusive answer. Her belt was two snakes tied. Athena also wore jewellery: a pendant on each ear, snake-shaped bracelets on each wrist and biceps, and a necklace.

=== The snake and shield ===
The left hand held her shield and spear. At her feet on the left side, her sacred snake nestled. In her right hand, perhaps leaning on a column for support, she held a statue of Nike, 2 m high. This symbol of victory held a crown of gold laurels, which she was to be about to place on the goddess's head. The column appears in copies made of terracotta or marble, which lack the tensile strength of bronze, but its presence in the original statue is debated. If it was included, the column could explain the fact that Athena's sacred snake was placed on her left side (where it partially hid the decoration of her shield), rather than on her right side, its usual position. Such a column might have been the first example of a Corinthian capital, which is said to have been developed by Iktinos for the temple of Apollo in Bassae.

The shield had a diameter of 4.8 to 5 m (15 ft 9 in to 16 ft 5 in) and was decorated on the outside with an amazonomachy. This was the most visible and therefore the most described and copied decorative element. According to Pausanias, the shield was carved by the famous metalsmith Mys based on drawings sketched by the painter Parhasius. In the centre was again a gorgoneion that may have looked like the Rondanini Medusa since it is strongly inspired by it. He was surrounded by about thirty fighters. Theseus commanded the Greek troops, so the Athenians. In front of them, Amazons were attacking the Acropolis as indicated by the steep scenery.

According to Plutarch, (Note: Life of Pericles, 31, 3-4.) Phidias was represented among the Athenians, in the centre at the top, as a bald old man preparing to throw the stone held with two hands above his head. Pericles would also have been included, right next to him, on the right, armed with a spear. This gesture, which was criticized for him, has been taken as proof that this relief-carved decoration was indeed by the hand of Phidias himself. The inside of the shield, less visible, was painted with a gigantomachy. The three fights represented on the statue (centauromachy, gigantomachy, and amazonomachy) were also found on the carved decoration of the Parthenon. The southern metopes are decorated with a centauromachy, those in the east with a gigantomachy, and those in the west with an amazonomachy.

The snake (δράκων), perhaps represented the Chthonian powers that would have been present on the acropolis from the beginning, or even Erichthonios himself whom the goddess had raised on her sacred rock. In fact, the monsters (sphinx, gryphons, winged horses, snakes, and gorgonians) that adorn the statue of the deity symbolize these primitive forces she domesticated.

The themes chosen to decorate this statue, as well as those that adorned the entire building, were part of an iconographic and political program of the celebration of the city through its guardian goddess. Athens, at the height of its power in the time of Pericles, evoked here the victory of (its) civilization over chaos, disorder, hybris, and barbarism in general, even beyond the commemoration of its victory in the Median wars. The virtues and piety of the city were read in its offering to its goddess. Its commercial and naval power materialized in the materials used: gold and ivory, very expensive, from far away.

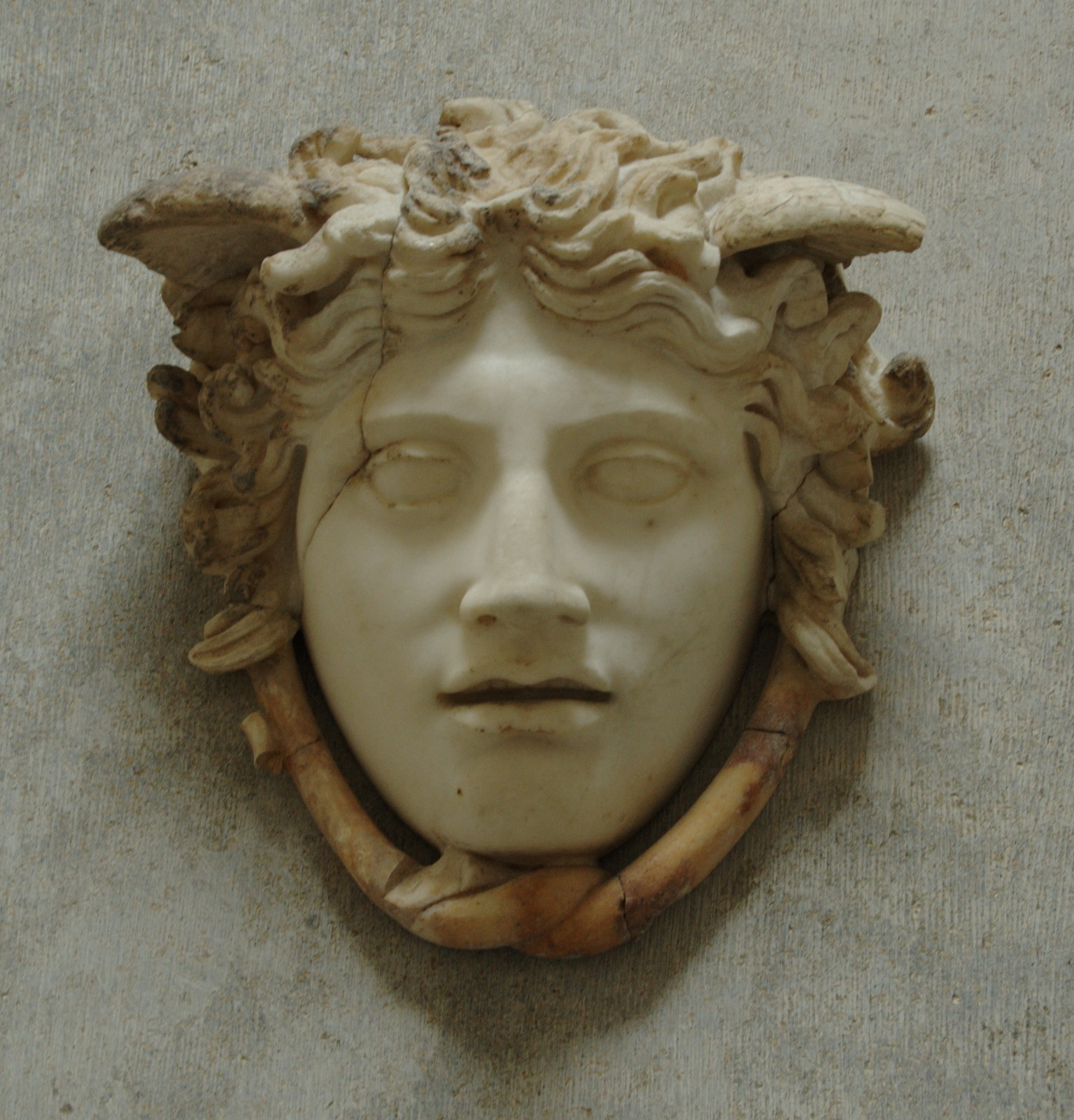
Medusa Rondanini, Munich Glyptothek, No. 252.

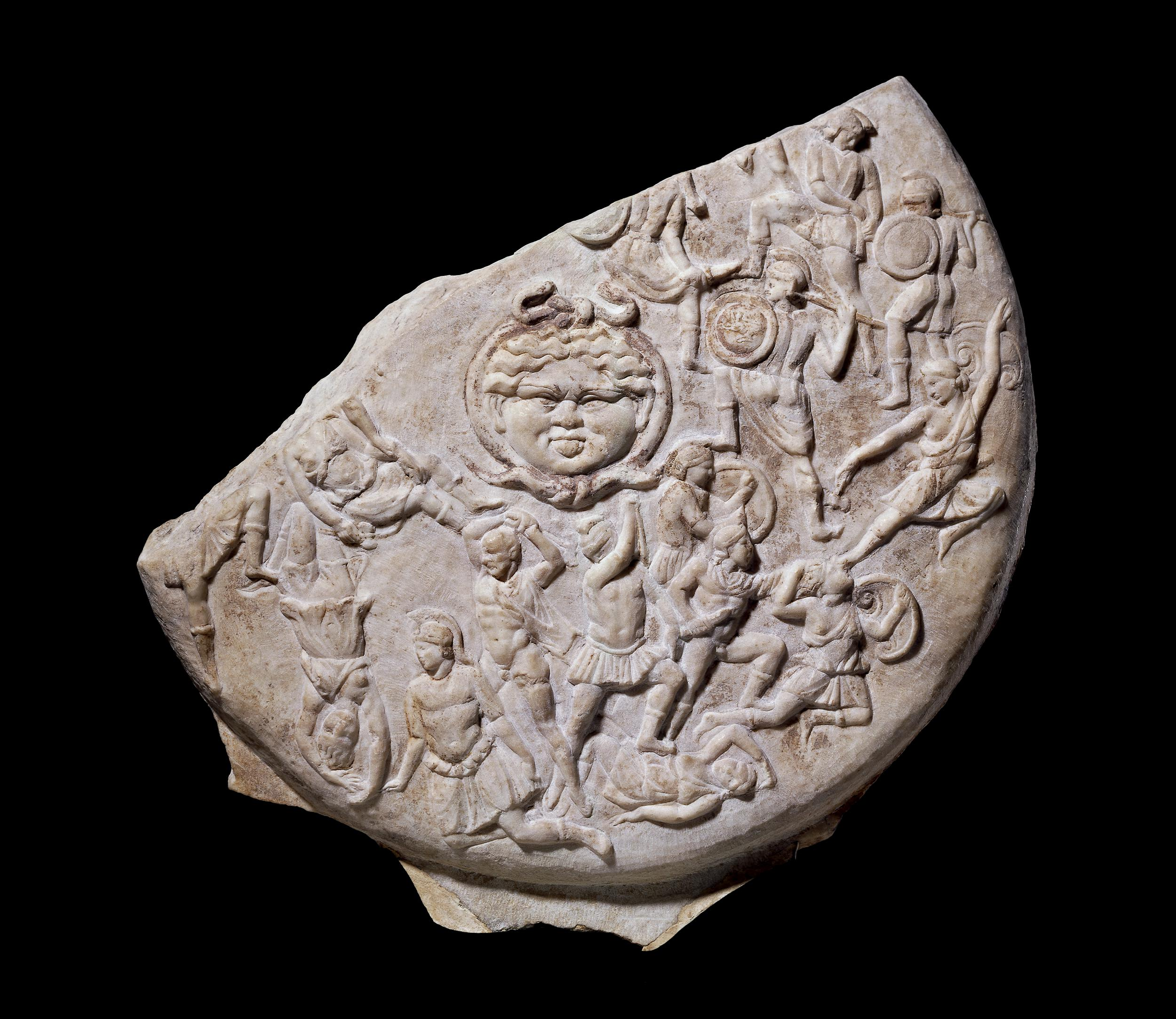
The Strangford Shield, a Roman copy of the shield of the Athena Parthenos; below the gorgon head are portraits of Phidias and Pericles

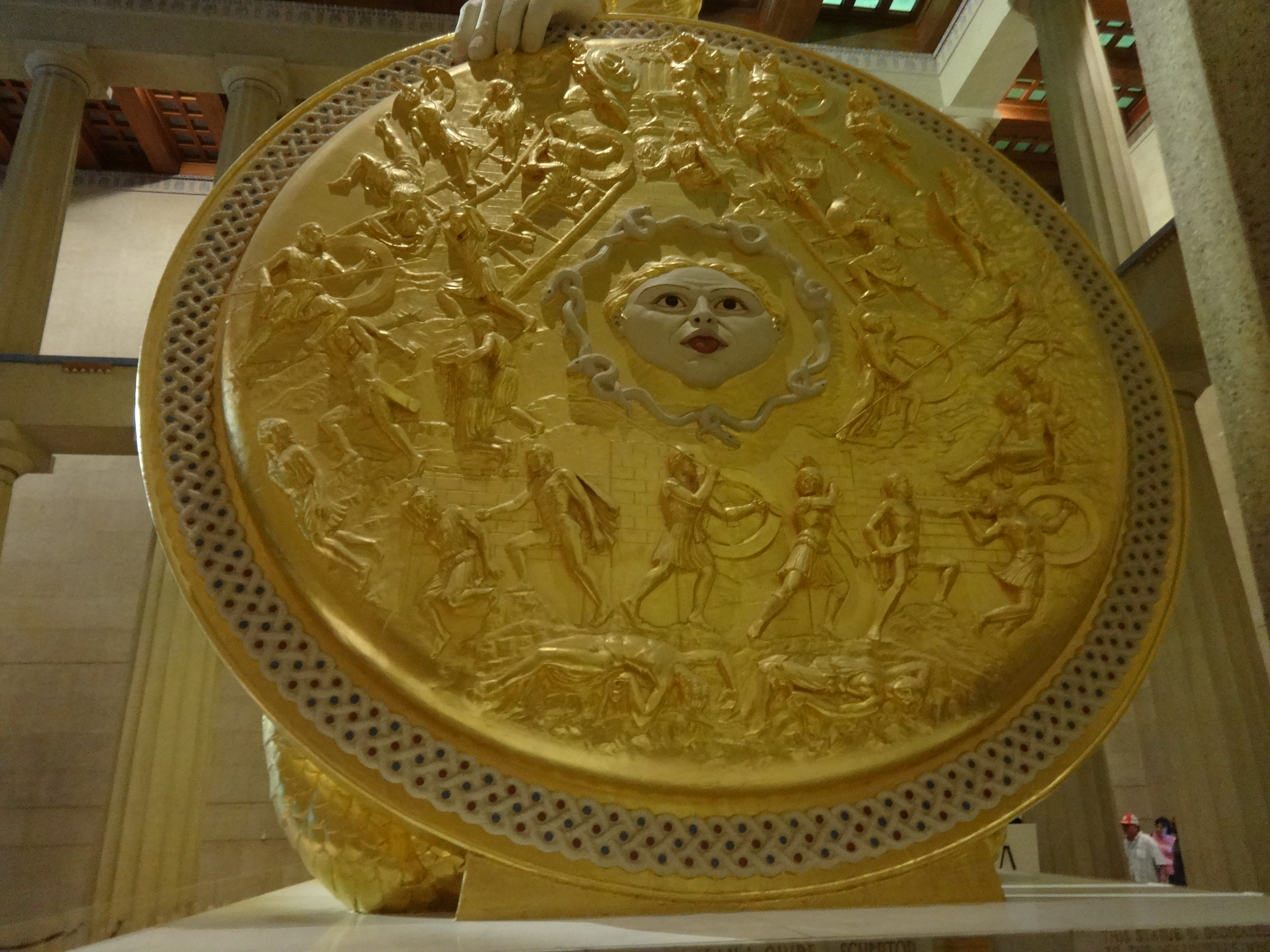
Life-size replica (cement and gilded steel) of the shield for the life-size replica of the statue in the replica of the Parthenon in Nashville.

== History ==
Ivory, a fragile material and subject to desiccation, was maintained with oiled water that was left available in a basin at the foot of the statue. The oil layer left a protective film preventing evaporation and giving shine to the ivory.

The luxury of the statue contrasted with its interior filled, like all chryselephantine statues, with "levers, corners, nails that cross the machine from side to side, ankles, pitch, clay and other things as shocking to the eye, not to mention an infinity of flies or shrews", as Lucian describes in Dream or the Rooster, XXIV.18.

According to sources in 438 BCE (from the consecration of the statue) or in 432 BCE (just before the outbreak of the Peloponnesian War), Phidias was accused of diverting part of the precious metals used to make the statue of Athena Parthenos, which was also sacrilege in itself since gold belonged to the goddess. Arrested, he would have escaped, which was interpreted as an admission of guilt. He reportedly fled to Olympia where he made the Chryselephantine statue of Zeus and where he died. For historians, an accusation against Phidias would then have been a way for Pericles' political opponents to attack the archon. Later, between 300 and 295 BCE, the tyrant Lachares allegedly had the gold plates removed to pay his troops. However, the veracity of this gesture is difficult to establish. If Lachares had taken gold permanently, he committed sacrilege. If his gesture was a simple "borrowing" from Athena, the rule was to repay with interest, difficult if the only way to obtain funds was to strip the goddess.

The Parthenon was ravaged by a fire at an indeterminate date in late antiquity, causing serious damage. The roof collapsed. The Doric columns of the naos were replaced by columns from the Hellenistic stoas of the Roman agora. The statue was damaged but restored. It may have been transported to Constantinople with the Chryselephantine statue of Zeus of Olympia where it could still have been in the 10th century CE. Another hypothesis is based on the presence of traces of a second base. The statue of Athena Parthenos could then have been replaced, at an indeterminate point in time. Until the edict of Theodosius in 380, the Parthenon retained its pagan religious role. It then seems to have experienced a more or less long period of abandonment. Somewhere between the fifth and the seventh century, the building was transformed into a church. Sources do not mention the statue at that time; it is therefore not possible to know if it had been destroyed or transported to Constantinople.

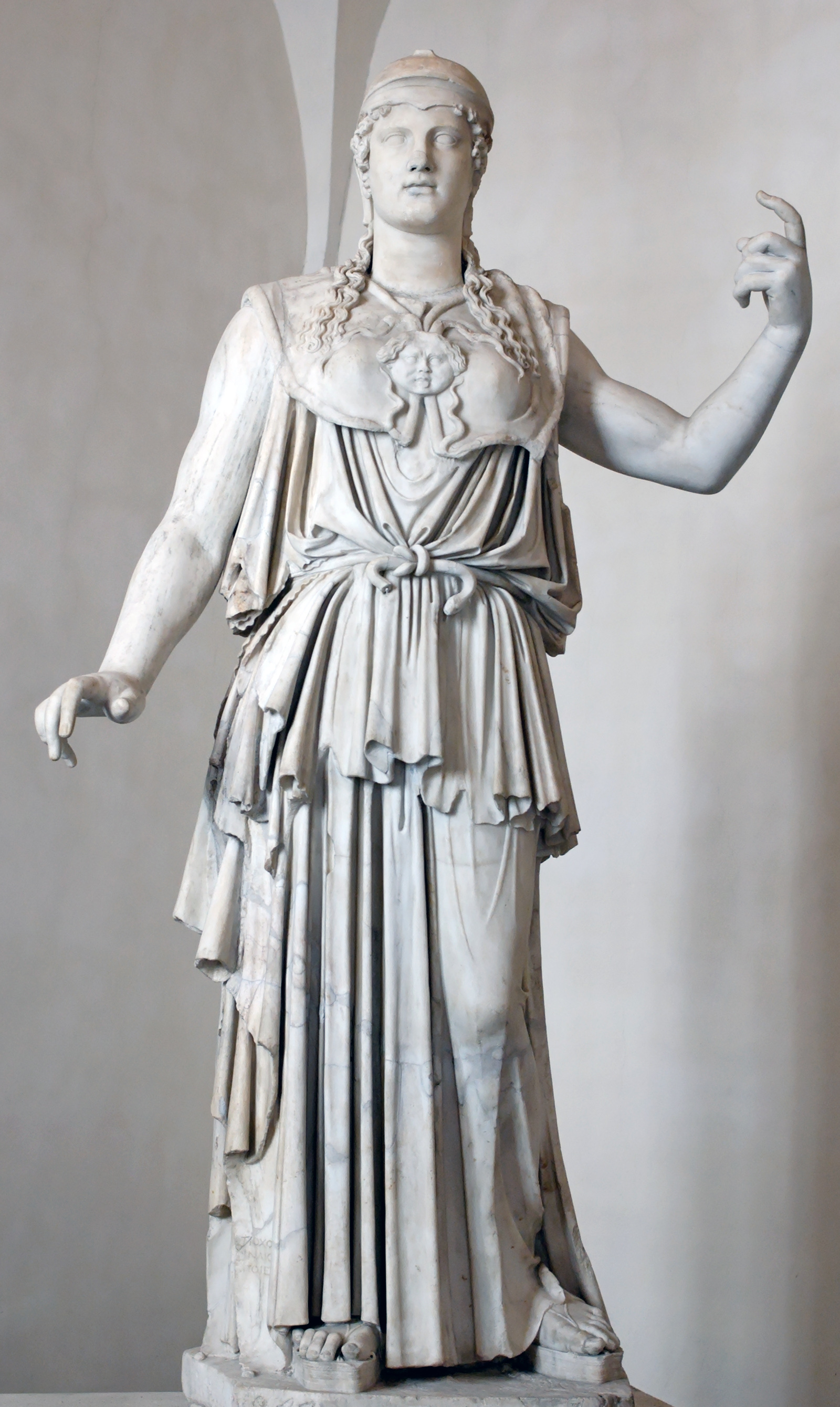
Roman copy (first century BC). A.D., restoration in the seventeenth century), signed by Antiochos. Roman National Museum (Palazzo Altemps), Inv. 8622.

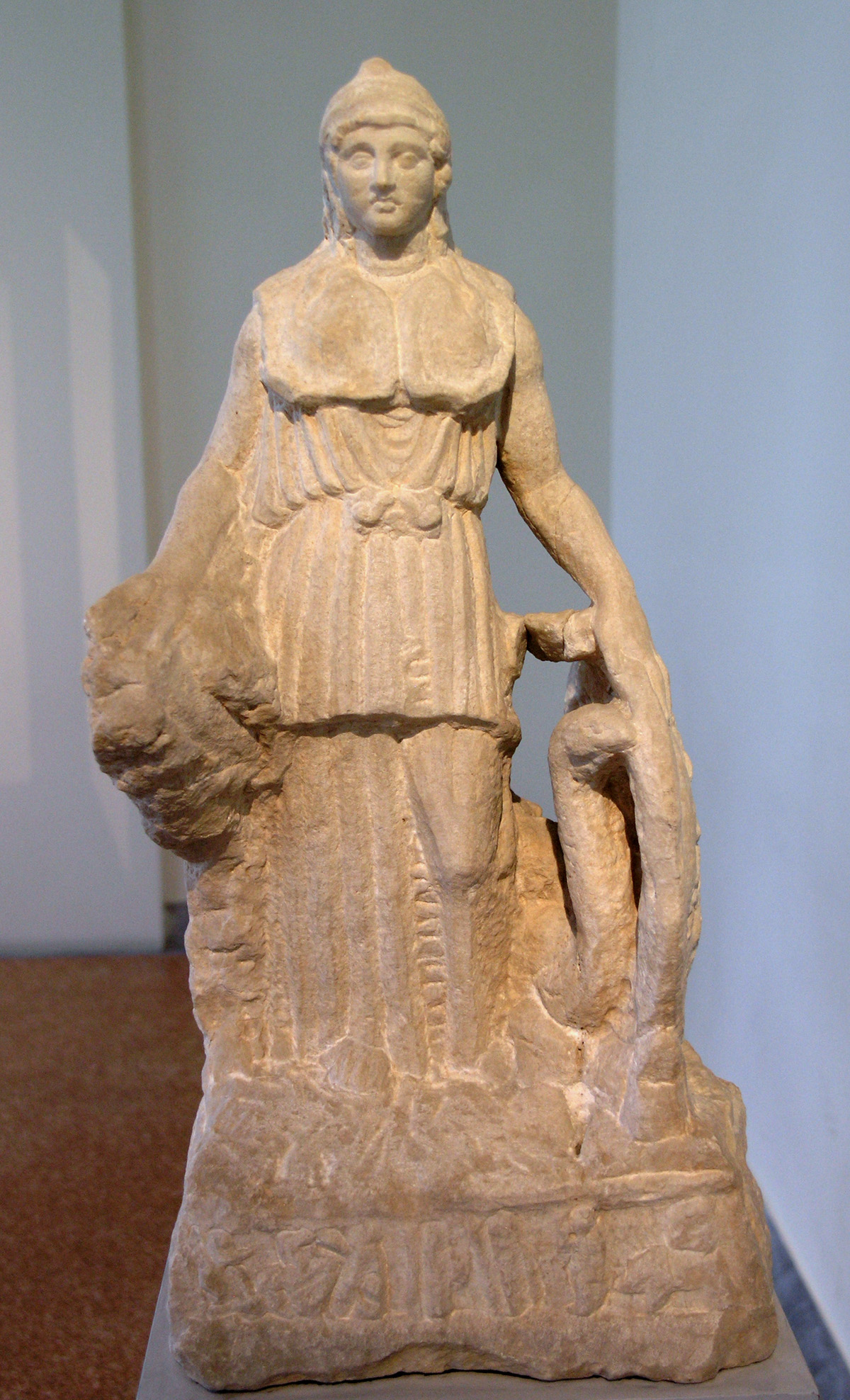
Lenormant Athena, marble copy of the Pentelica (probably 1st century AD). Pandora's birth is reproduced on the basis. (National Archaeological Museum of Athens 128).

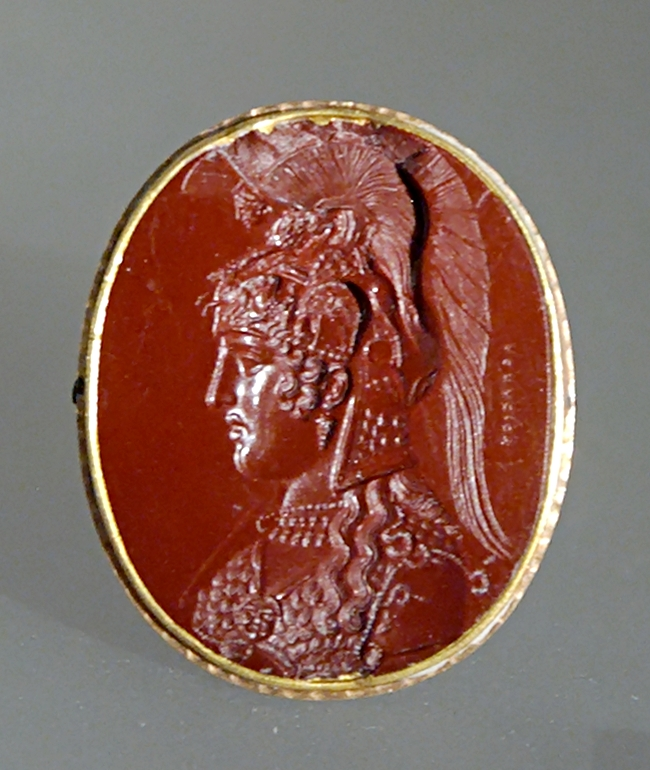
Profile of the Athena Parthenos, Engraved by Aspasios (1st century AD) Roman National Museum (Inv. 108684)

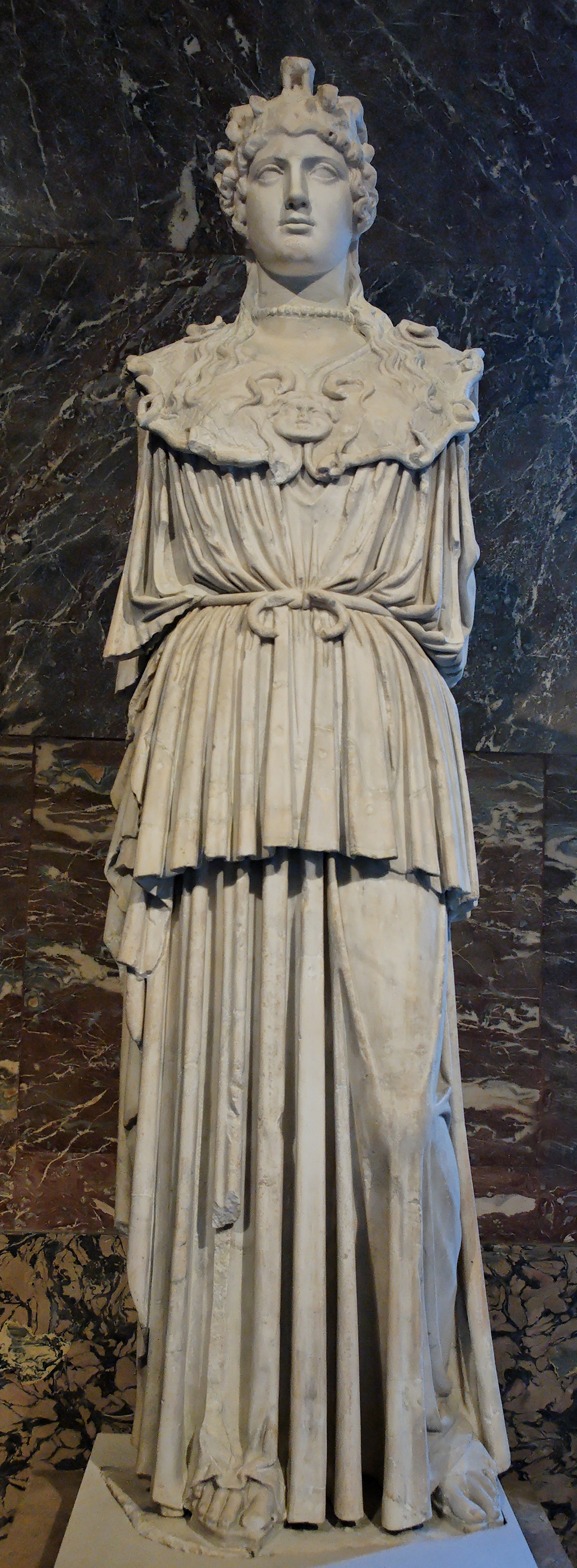
Minerva with necklace, Roman marble copy of Paros (1st or 2nd century AD). Louvre (Ma91)

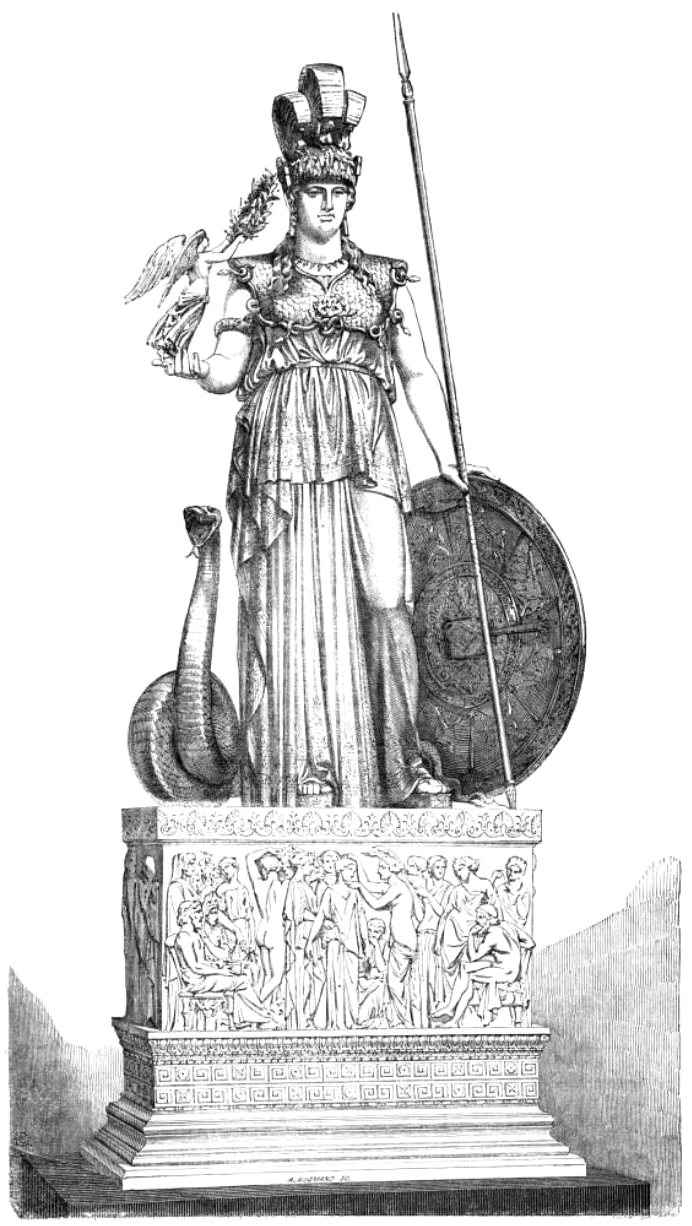
Simart's Minerva, 1855. The Picturesque Store, vol. 24 (1856).

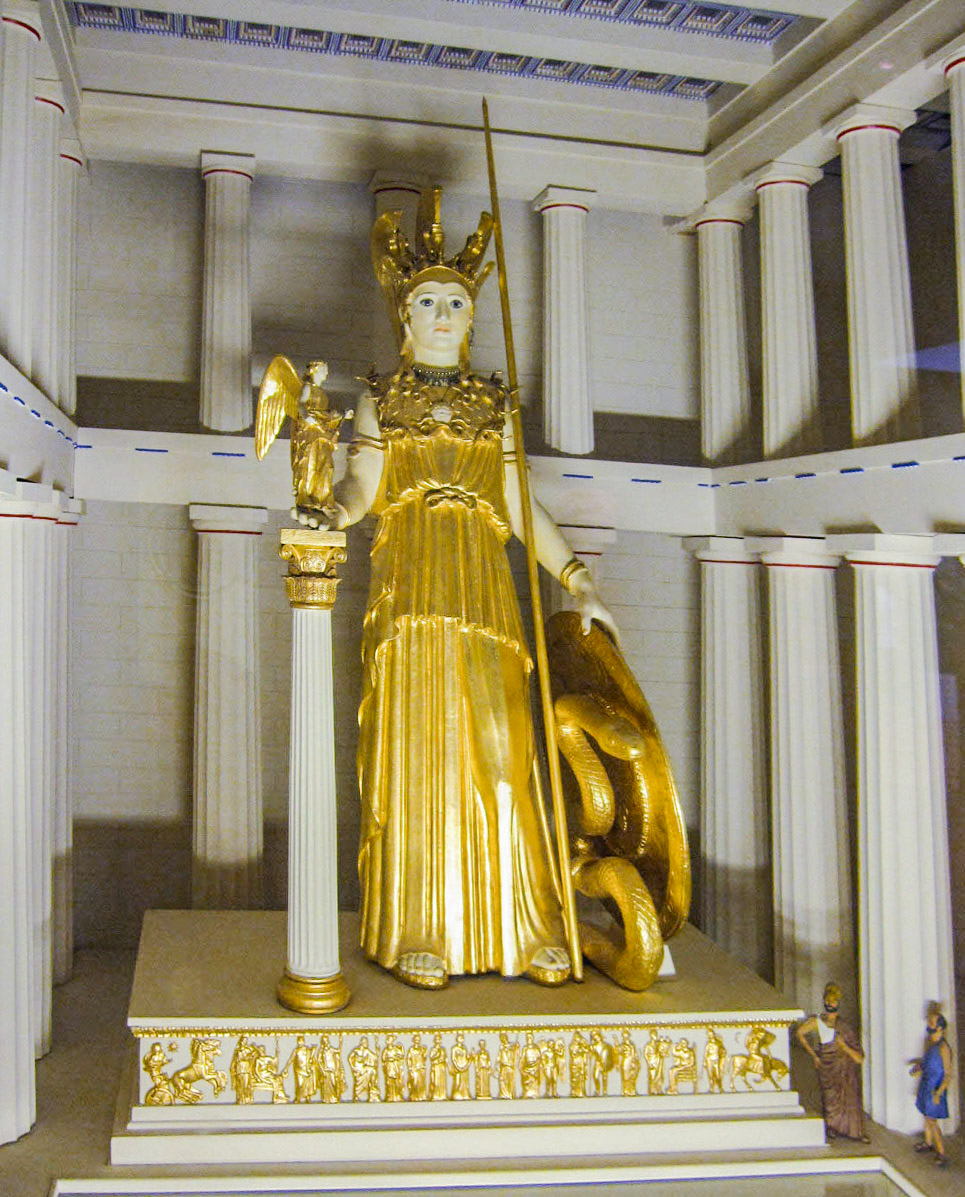
Small model of the Athena Parthenos, with a column of the Corinthian order supporting Athena's arm holding Nike. Restitution suggested by Neda Liepen. Royal Ontario Museum.

== Antique copies and replicas ==
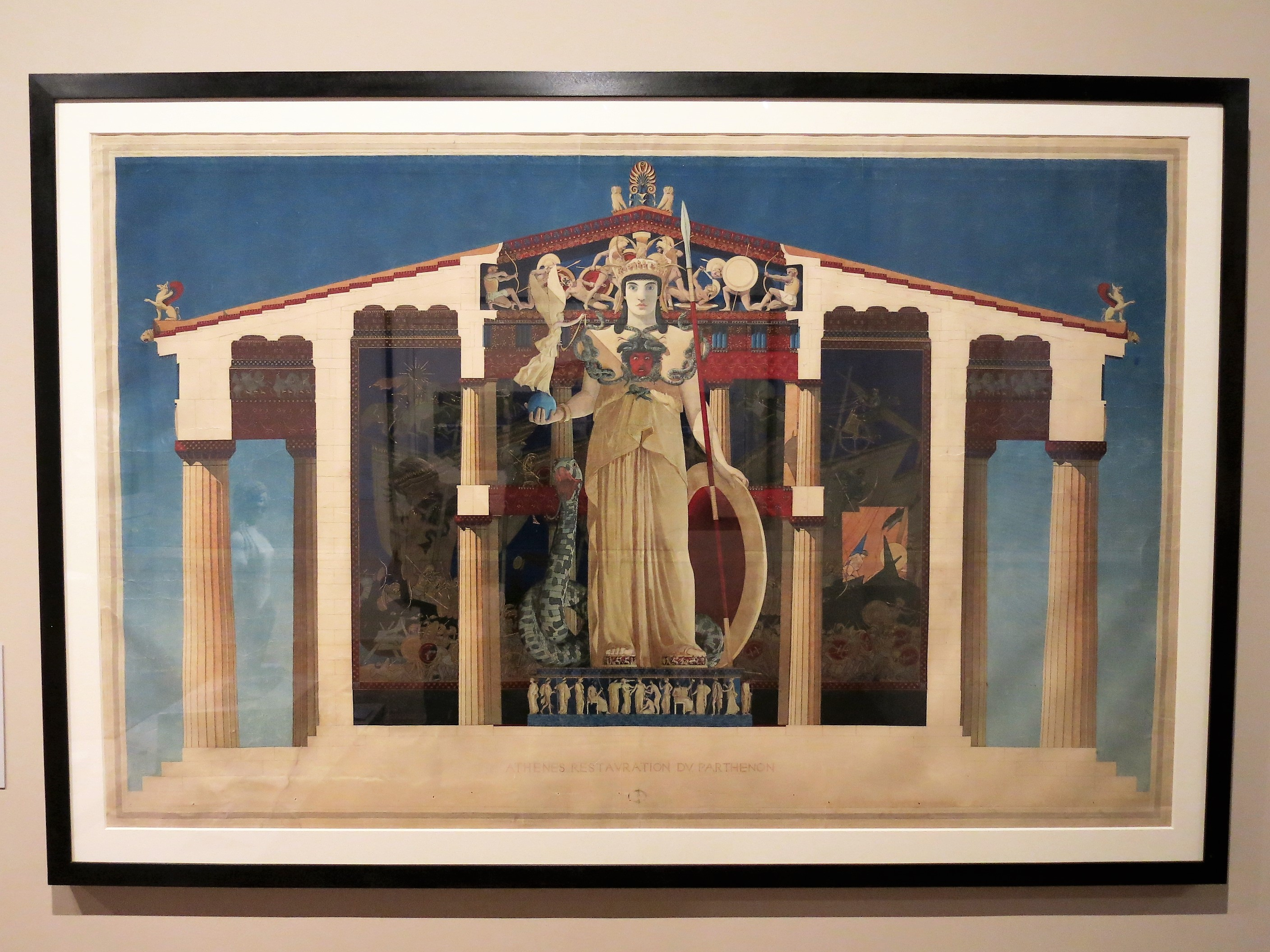
Parthenon - Cross section restored. Benoît Édouard Loviot. 1879. Paris Musée des Beaux-Arts. Inv. Env. 71–07.

At least sixty-nine small-scale copies of the statue are known. Very early on, her influence was felt, sometimes very far away. Thus, gold medallions from a tomb in Kul-Oba (Crimea) and preserved in the Hermitage Museum, reproduce the head of the statue. During Roman times, small copies were mass-produced, sometimes simplifying the decor. The Varvakeion Athena is one of the most famous examples. Sometimes, only the decoration was reproduced, mainly that of the outside of the shield, apparently in the form of decorative plates for export.

Among the most famous ancient copies are the Lenormant Athena and therefore the Varvakeion Athena preserved in the National Archaeological Museum of Athens, the Minerva with necklace at the Louvre, or a Roman copy signed Antiochos preserved at the Roman National Museum (Palazzo Altemps). A restoration was made by sculptor Pierre-Charles Simart between 1846 and 1855 for the Duke of Luynes. It is exhibited in its castle in Dampierre.

A life-size replica was made in 1990 for the Nashville Parthenon by American sculptor Alan LeQuire. On a steel and aluminium frame, a mixture of plaster and fibreglass was covered with 8.5 lbs of gold leaf.

In 2024, the Parthenon and the statue of Athena were reconstructed by Juan de Lara in 3D and developed into a digital project titled The Parthenon 3D. De Lara was able to reconstruct the visual effects of the gold and ivory when light interacted with them in a fully physically-based rendered environment.

== Sources ==
- Boardman, John (1985), Greek Sculpture: The Classical Period a handbook, Thames and Hudson
- Cosmopoulos, Michael B., ed. (2004). The Parthenon and Its Sculptures. New York: Cambridge.
- Harris, Diane (1995). The Treasures of the Parthenon and Erechtheion. Oxford.
- Harrison, Evelyn B. (1966). "The Composition of the Amazonomachy on the Shield of Athena Parthenos". Hesperia. 35 (2). The American School of Classical Studies at Athens: 107–133. doi:10.2307/147300. JSTOR 147300.
- Holtzmann, Bernard; Pasquier, Alain (1998), Histoire de l'art antique : l'Art grec, Paris, La Documentation française / Réunion des musées nationaux, coll. « Manuels de l'École du Louvre »
- Holtzmann, Bernard (2003), L'Acropole d'Athènes : Monuments, cultes and histoire du sanctuaire d'Athéna Polias, Paris: Picard, coll. « Antiqua »
- Hurwit, Jeffrey M. (1995). "Beautiful Evil: Pandora and the Athena Parthenos". American Journal of Archaeology. 99 (2): 171–186. doi:10.2307/506338. JSTOR 506338. S2CID 193039161.
- Lapatin, Kenneth (2005), "The Statue of Athena and other Treasures in the Parthenon", in Neils, Jenifer (ed.), The Parthenon: from Antiquity to the Present, Cambridge University Press
- Leipen, Neda (1971). Athena Parthenos: A Reconstruction. Toronto: Royal Ontario Museum.
- Neils, Jenifer, ed. (1996). Worshipping Athena: Panathenaia and Parthenon. Madison: Wisconsin.
- Neils, Jenifer, ed. (2005). The Parthenon: From Antiquity to the Present. New York: Cambridge.
- Neils, Jenifer (2006). The Parthenon Frieze. Cambridge.
- Nick, Gabriele (2002). Die Athena Parthenos: Studien zum griechischen Kultbild und seiner Rezeption. Mainz: von Zabern.
- Ousterhout, Robert (2005). ""Bestride the Very Peak of Heaven": The Parthenon After Antiquity". In Neils, Jenifer (ed.). The Parthenon: From Antiquity to the Present. Cambridge University Press.
- Queyrel, François (2020). Le Parthénon, un monument dans l'Histoire. Paris: Bartillat.
