= MYS =

MYS or Mys could refer to:

== Places ==
- Mys, Perm Krai, a village in Russia
- Malaysia, ISO 3166-1 alpha-3 country code MYS
- Mysore Railway Station, Karnataka, India; Indian Railways station code MYS
- Mystic (Amtrak station), Connecticut, United States; Amtrak station code MYS

== Other uses ==
- Masisa, New York Stock Exchange symbol MYS, a Chilean company
- Minnesota Youth Symphonies
- Monaco Yacht Show
- Mystic Records

== See also ==
- Gaelle Mys (born 1991), Belgian artistic gymnast
