= Lenormant Athena =

Greek statuette of the goddess Athena

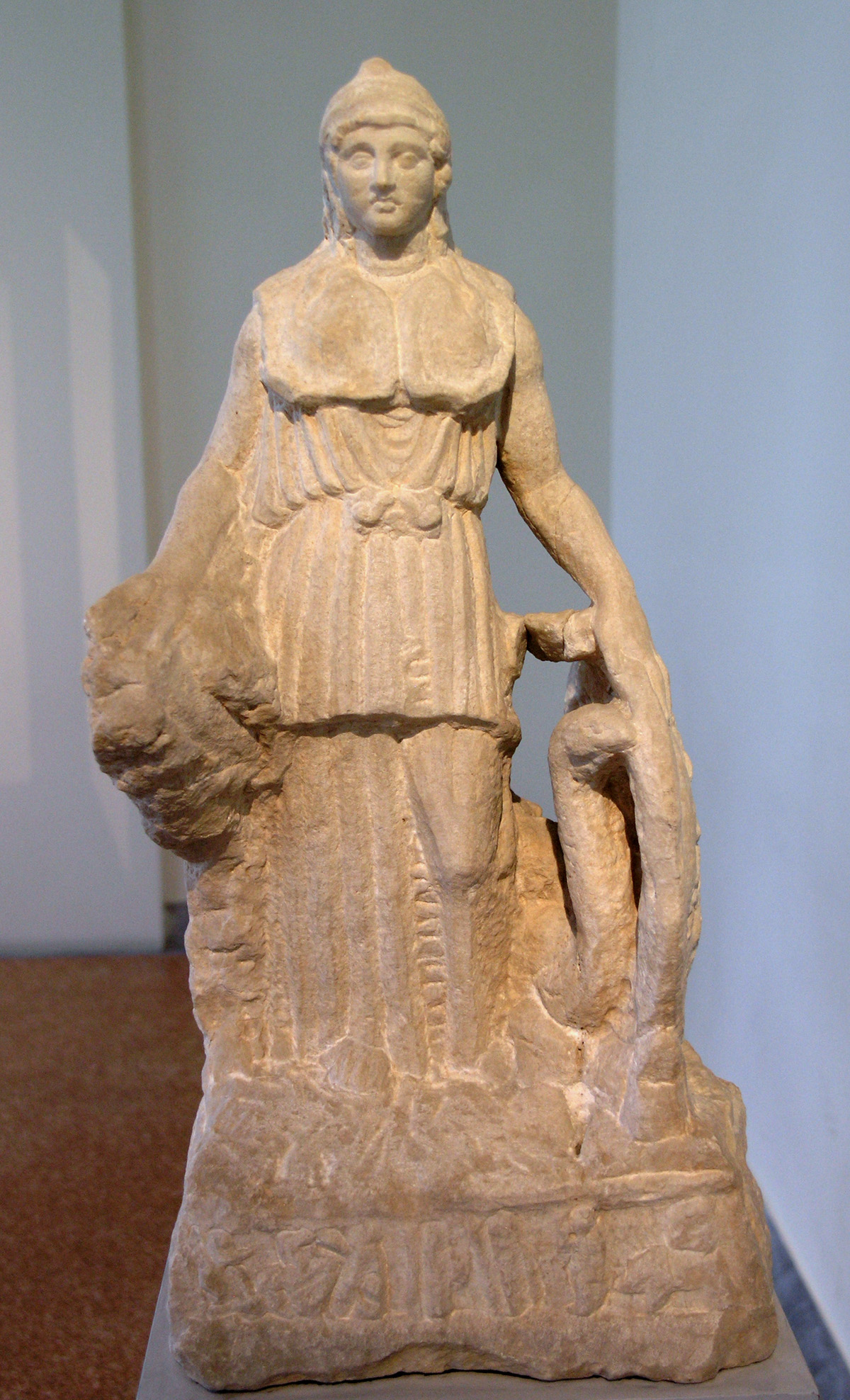
Front view of the Lenormant Athena

The Lenormant Athena is the name given to a small Greek statuette made in the first century CE.

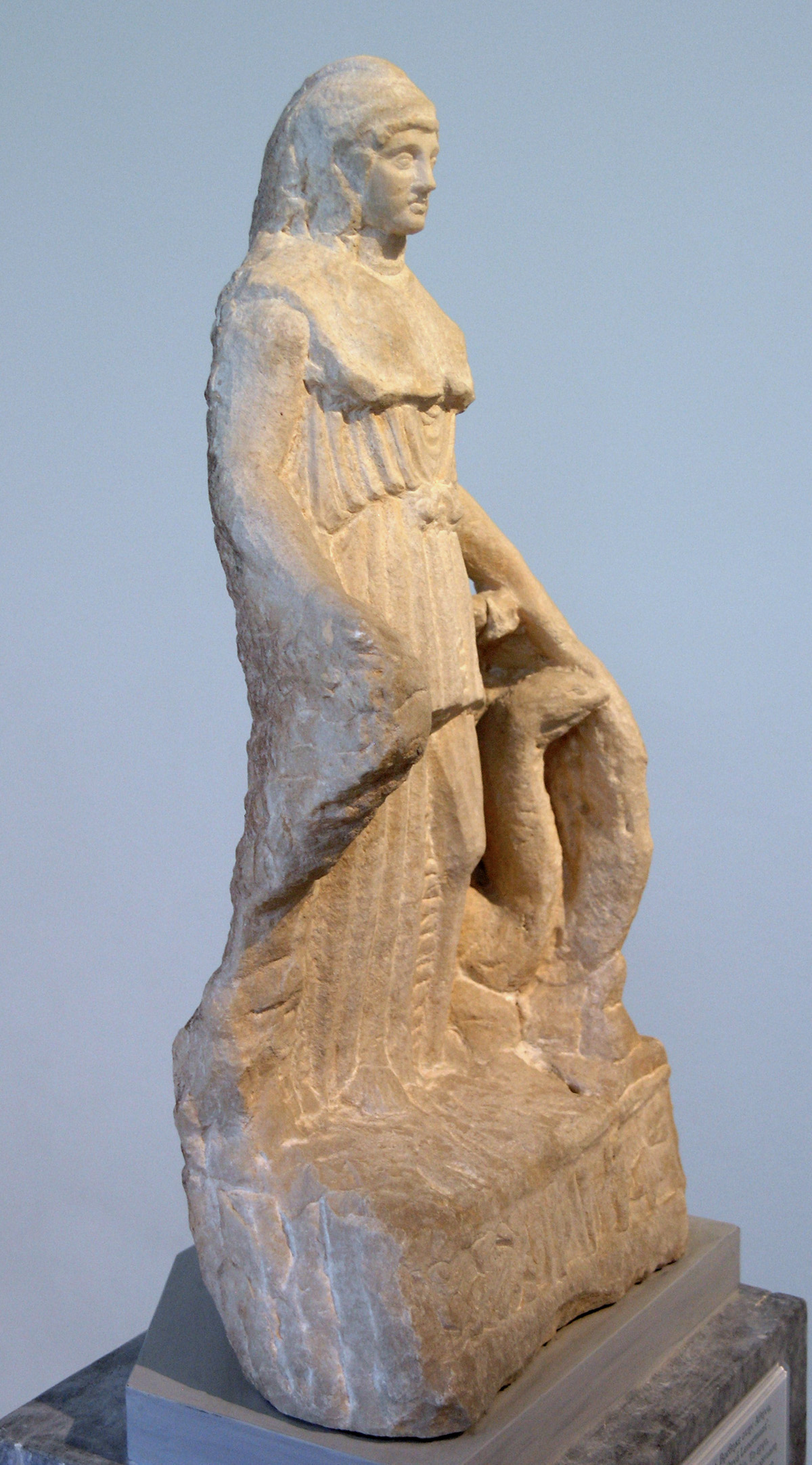
Side view, showing the unworked reverse

== Discovery ==
The Lenormant Athena was discovered in 1859 near the Pnyx hill in Athens and identified by François Lenormant a year later as a small copy of the Athena Parthenos of Phidias. The 41 centimetres (16 in) high pentelic marble sculpture has thus come to be known by his name. The unfinished work is of great artistic and historical significance since it not only shows what Phidias' statue looked like but also the reliefs on her shield and the base on which she stood, which are otherwise only known from literary sources.

== Description ==
Athena stands in a quiet, graceful pose, resting her weight on her right leg. She is dressed in an Attic peplos. Her left arm rests on her shield. An Amazonomachy is depicted on the shield. In her right hand, which rests on a strong support, Athena may have held a Nike, which has not survived. The unfinished base depicts the birth of Pandora. The back is still in an unfinished state as well.

== Location ==
Today, the statuette is stored in the National Archaeological Museum, Athens, with inventory number 128.

== Bibliography ==
- Nikolaos Kaltsas: Sculpture in the National Archaeological Museum, Athens. The J. Paul Getty Museum, Los Angeles 2002 ISBN 0-89236-686-9, p. 106.
