= Mys, Perm Krai =

Mys Мыс
- Village
- Location within Perm Krai Location within Russia
- Coordinates: 60°07′N 54°53′E
- Country: Russia
- Region: Perm Krai
- District: Kosinsky District
- Time zone: UTC+5:00

Mys (Russian: Мыс) is a rural locality (a village) in Kosinskoye Rural Settlement, Kosinsky District, Perm Krai, Russia. The population was 104 as of 2010. There are 4 streets.

== Geography ==
Mys is located 23 km north of Kosa (the district's administrative centre) by road. Poroshevo is the nearest rural locality.
