= Ageleia =

Ancient Greek mythological epithet

Ageleia (Ancient Greek: Ἀγελεία) or Ageleis (Ἀγεληῖς) was an epithet of the Greek goddess Athena, of somewhat obscure definition, mostly playing off the meaning of the Greek words ago (ἄγω), the verb for "leading" or "doing", and leia (λεία), a noun meaning "plunder" or "spoils", particularly herds of cattle.

To some writers, it is the name by which she is designated as the leader or protectress of the people, as a herder protects his cattle. In other sources, the name is taken more literally, and Athena Ageleia is the "pillager" or "she who carries off the spoils".
