= Ancient Greek sculpture =

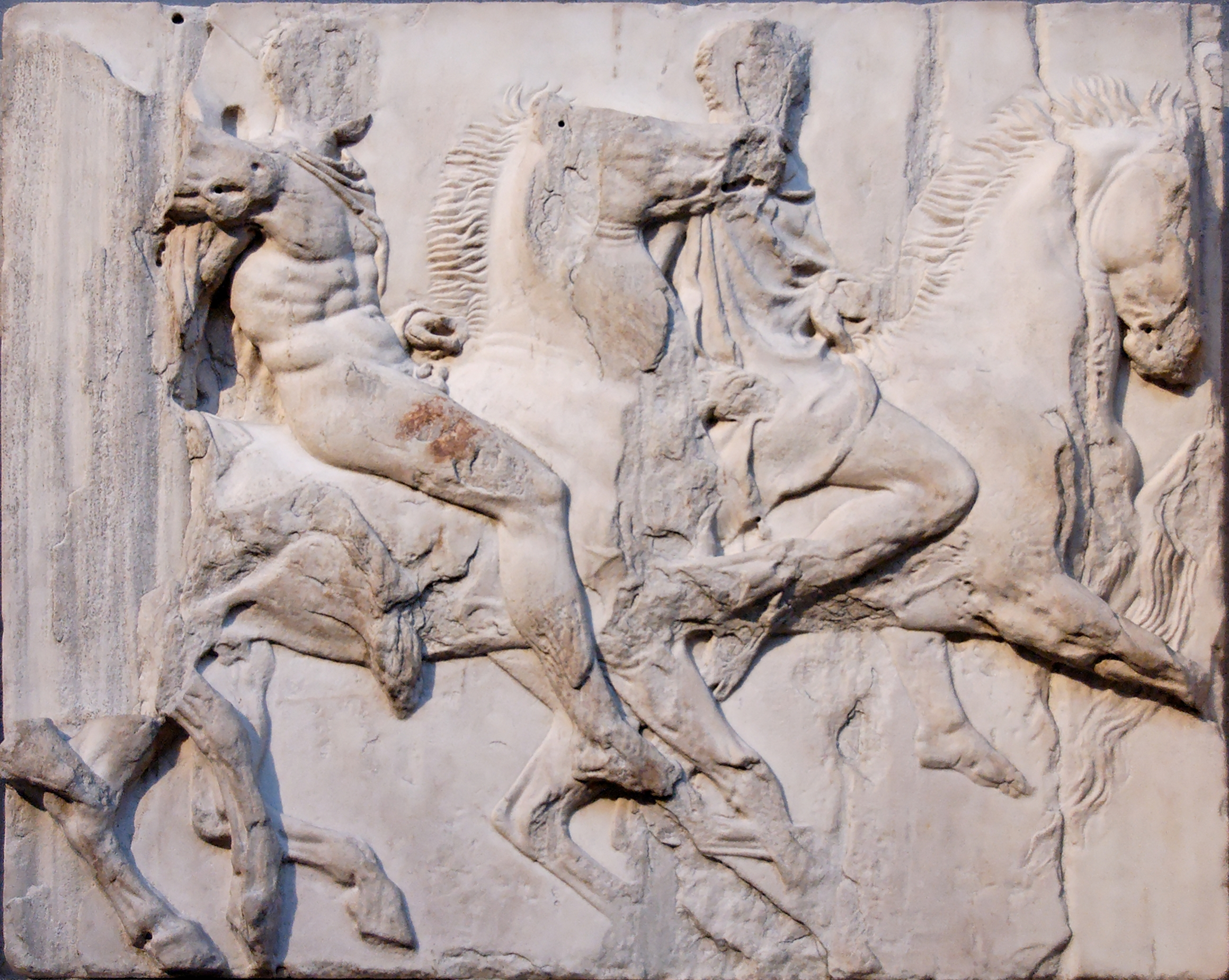
Riders from the Parthenon Frieze, around 440 BC, key examples of Classical Greek sculpture

The sculpture of ancient Greece is the main surviving type of fine ancient Greek art as, with the exception of painted ancient Greek pottery, almost no ancient Greek painting survives. Modern scholarship identifies three major stages in monumental sculpture in bronze and stone: Archaic Greek sculpture (from about 650 to 480 BC), Classical (480–323 BC) and Hellenistic thereafter. At all periods there were great numbers of Greek terracotta figurines and small sculptures in metal and other materials.

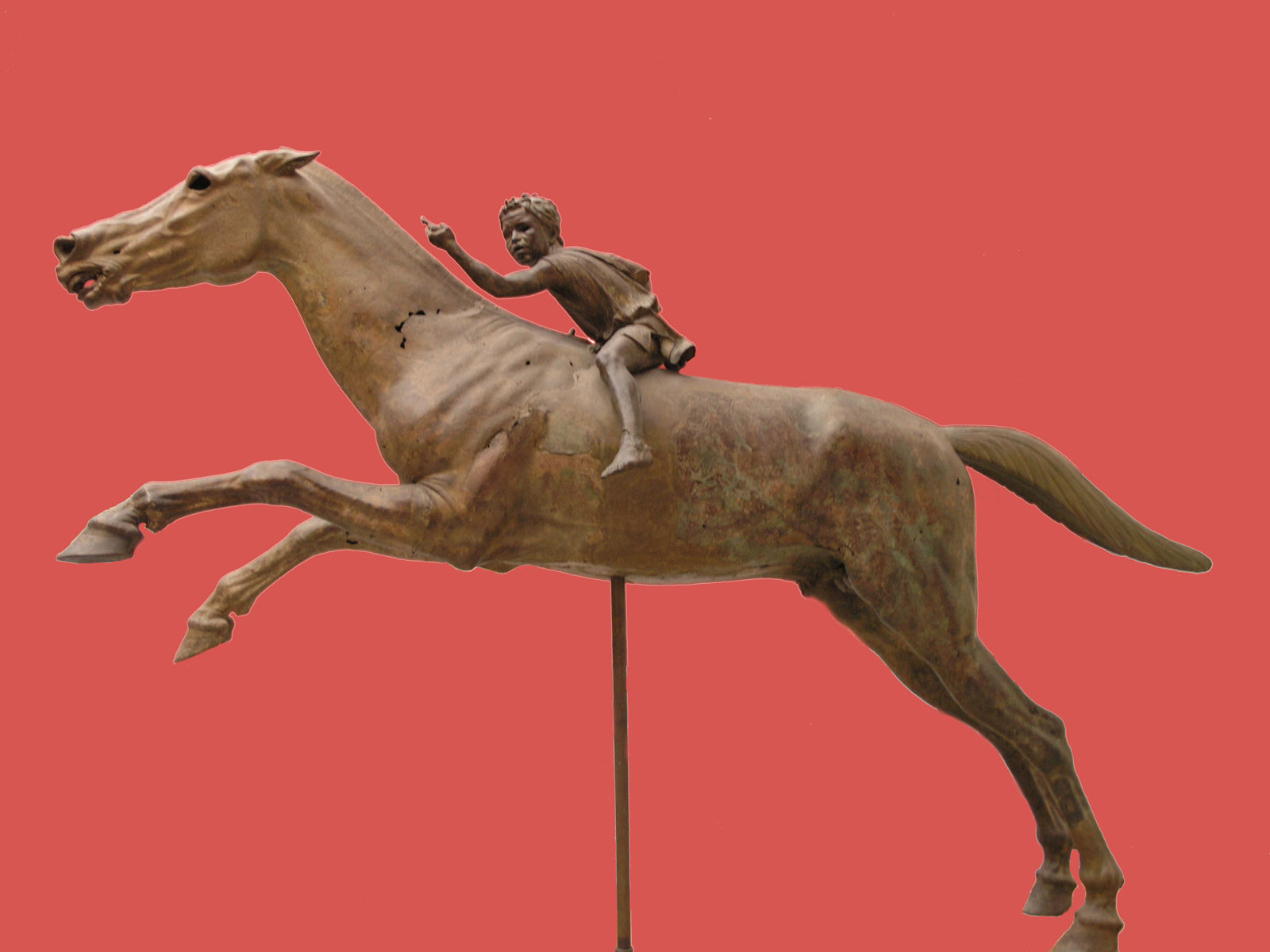
Jockey of Artemision. Late Hellenistic bronze statue of a mounted jockey, National Archaeological Museum, Athens.

The Greeks decided very early on that the human form was the most important subject for artistic endeavour. Since they pictured their gods as having human form, there was little distinction between the sacred and the secular in art—the human body was both secular and sacred. A male nude of Apollo or Heracles shows only slight differences in treatment from a sculpture of that year's Olympic boxing champion. The statue (originally single, but by the Hellenistic period often in groups) was the dominant form, although reliefs, often so "high" that they were almost free-standing, were also important.

Bronze was the most prestigious material, but is the least common to survive, as it was always expensive and generally recycled.

== Materials ==
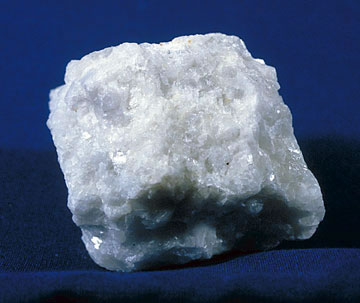
Natural marble

By the Classical period, roughly the 5th and 4th centuries BC, monumental sculpture was composed almost entirely of marble or bronze, with cast bronze becoming the favoured medium for major works by the early 5th century BC. Many pieces of sculpture now known only in marble copies made for the Roman market had been originally made in bronze. The territories of ancient Greece, except for Sicily and southern Italy, contained abundant supplies of fine marble, with Pentelic and Parian marble the most highly prized. The ores for bronze were also relatively easy to obtain. Smaller works were in a great variety of materials, many of them precious, but there was also a very large production of terracotta figurines.

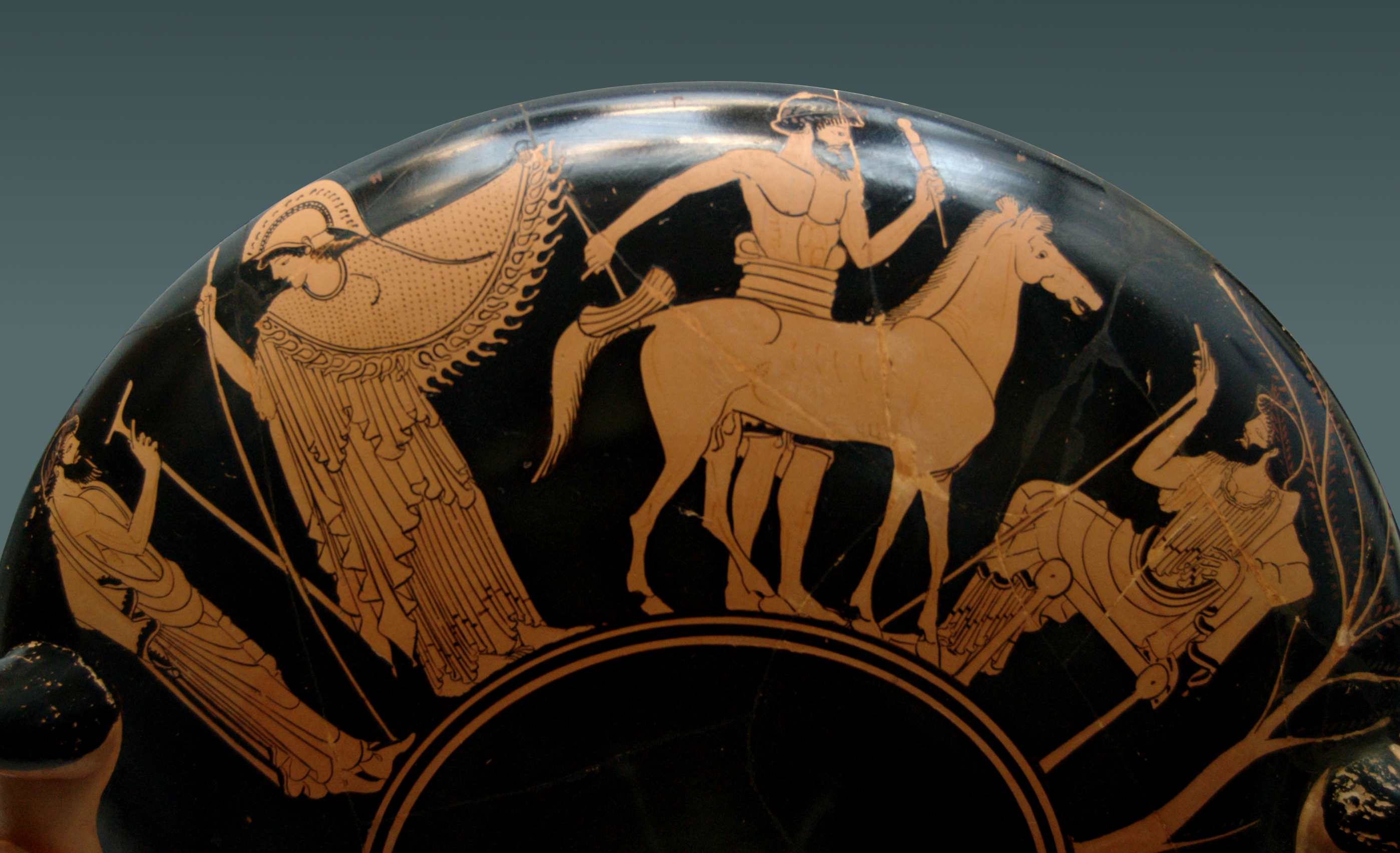
Athena in the workshop of a sculptor working on a marble horse, Attic red-figure kylix, 480 BC, Staatliche Antikensammlungen (Inv. 2650)

Both marble and bronze are relatively easy to form and very durable. No doubt there were also traditions of sculpture in wood, as in most ancient cultures, but we know very little of them apart from acrolithic sculptures, usually large, in which the head and exposed flesh parts were carved in marble but the clothed parts in wood. Bronze always had a significant scrap value, so that very few original bronzes have survived. But in recent years marine archaeology or trawling have added a few spectacular finds, such as the Artemision Bronze and Riace bronzes, which have significantly extended modern understanding of ancient bronze art. Many copies from the later Roman period are marble versions of works whose originals had been cast in bronze. In the Archaic period ordinary limestone was used for sculpture, but thereafter (except in areas of the Italian Peninsula with no local marble) only for architectural sculpture and decoration. Plaster or stucco was sometimes used, only for the hair.

Chryselephantine sculptures, used for temple cult images and luxury works, used gold (most often in leaf form) and ivory for all of the figure or for faces and hands. Probably some included gems and other materials, but these were much less common, and only fragments have survived.

Many statues were given jewellery, as can be seen from the holes for attaching it, and held weapons or other objects in different materials.

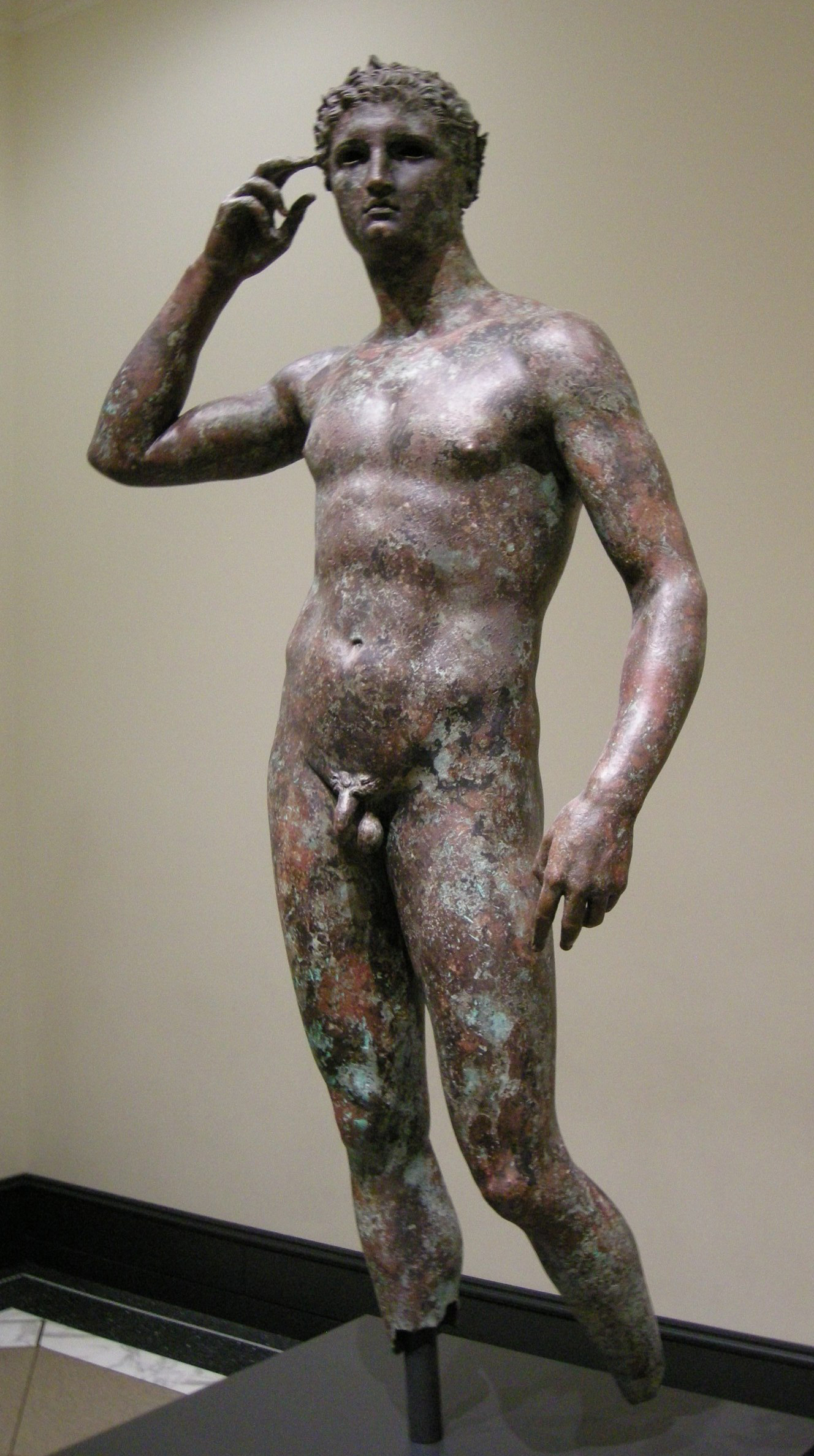
The Victorious Youth (c. 310 BC), a remarkably well-preserved bronze statue of a Greek athlete in contrapposto pose

== Painting of sculpture ==
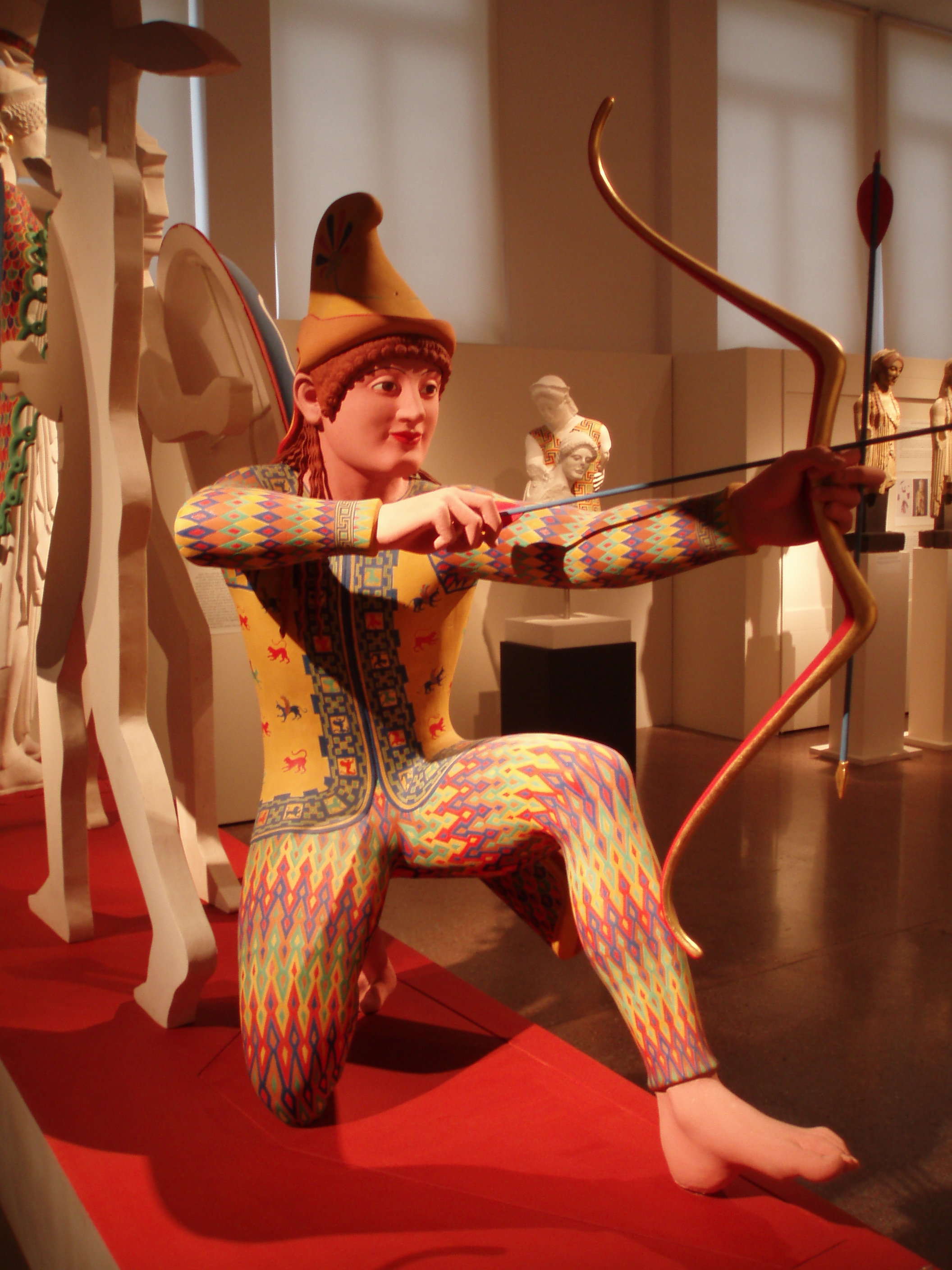
While the pigments originally present on most sculptures from the era have worn away, Greek sculptures were originally painted. This experimental colour restoration shows what a statue of a Trojan archer from the Temple of Aphaia, Aegina may have originally looked like.

Ancient Greek sculptures were originally painted in multiple colours; they appear colourless today only because the original pigments have deteriorated. References to painted sculptures are found in classical literature, including in Euripides's Helen, in which the eponymous character laments, "If only I could shed my beauty and assume an uglier aspect / The way you would wipe colour off a statue." Some well-preserved statues still bear traces of pigments and archaeologists can reconstruct what they may have originally looked like.

== Development of Greek sculptures ==
=== Geometric ===
It is commonly thought that the earliest incarnation of Greek sculpture was in the form of wooden or ivory cult statues, first described by Pausanias as xoana. No such statues survive, and the descriptions of them are vague, despite the fact that they were probably objects of veneration for hundreds of years. The first piece of Greek statuary to be reassembled is probably the Lefkandi Centaur, a terracotta sculpture found on the island of Euboea, dated c. 920 BC. The statue was constructed in parts, before being dismembered and buried in two separate graves. The centaur has an intentional mark on its knee, which has led researchers to postulate that the statue might portray Cheiron, presumably kneeling wounded from Herakles' arrow. If so, it would be the earliest known depiction of myth in the history of Greek sculpture.

The forms from the Geometric period (c. 900 to 700 BC) were chiefly terracotta figurines, bronzes, and ivories. The bronzes are chiefly tripod cauldrons, and freestanding figures or groups. Such bronzes were made using the lost-wax technique probably introduced from Syria, and are almost entirely votive offerings left at the Hellenistic civilization Panhellenic sanctuaries of Olympia, Delos, and Delphi, though these were likely manufactured elsewhere, as a number of local styles may be identified by finds from Athens, Argos, and Sparta. Typical works of the era include the Karditsa warrior (Athens Br. 12831) and the many examples of the equestrian statuette (for example, NY Met. 21.88.24 online). The repertory of this bronze work is not confined to standing men and horses, however, as vase paintings of the time also depict imagery of stags, birds, beetles, hares, griffins and lions.

There are no inscriptions on early-to-middle geometric sculpture, until the appearance of the Mantiklos "Apollo" (Boston 03.997) of the early 7th century BC found in Thebes. The figure is that of a standing man with a pseudo-daedalic form, underneath which lies the hexameter inscription reading "Mantiklos offered me as a tithe to Apollo of the silver bow; do you, Phoibos [Apollo], give some pleasing favour in return". Apart from the novelty of recording its own purpose, this sculpture adapts the formulae of oriental bronzes, as seen in the shorter more triangular face and slightly advancing left leg. This is sometimes seen as anticipating the greater expressive freedom of the 7th century BC and, as such, the Mantiklos figure is referred to in some quarters as proto-Daedalic.

=== Archaic ===
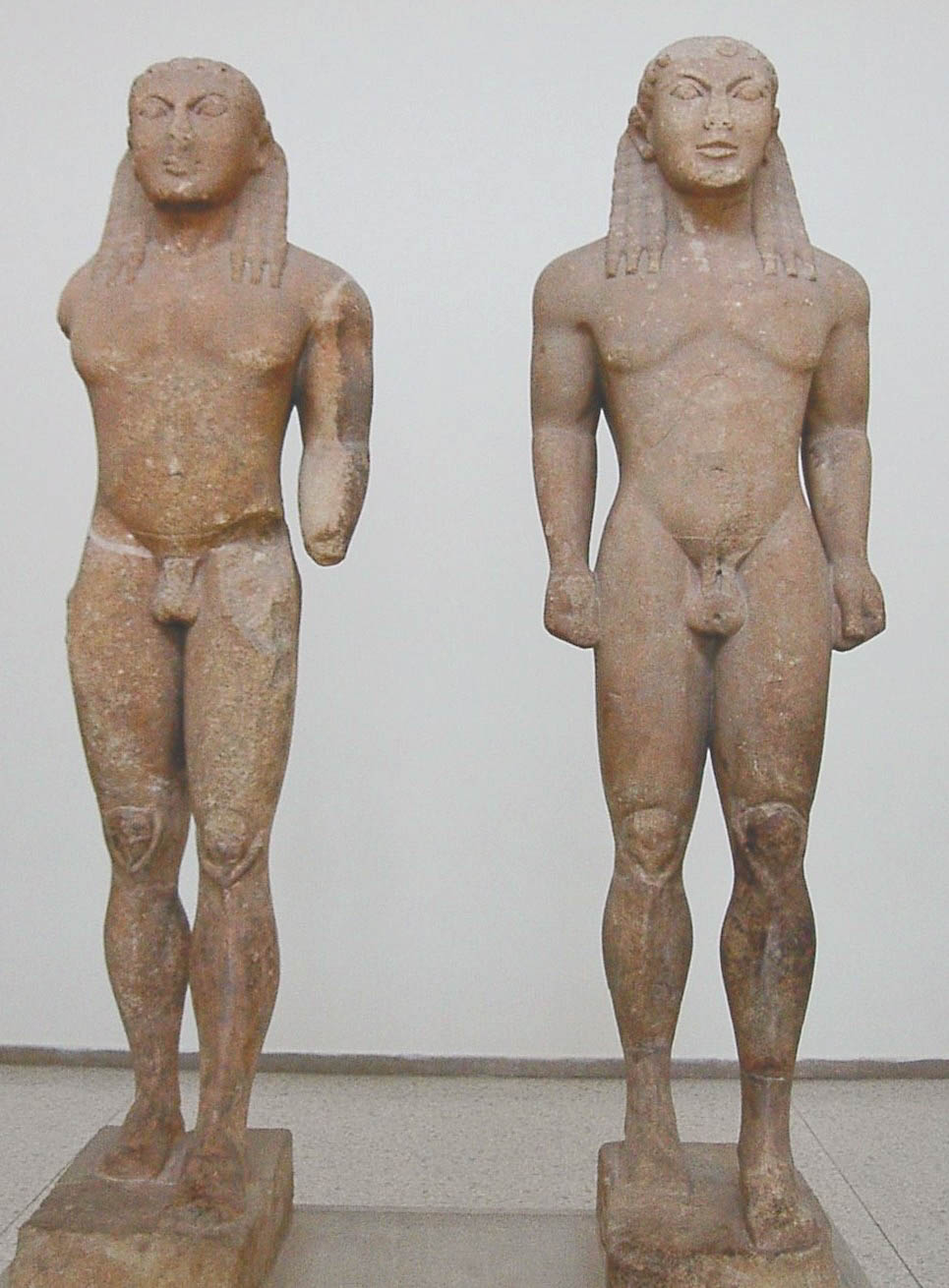
Kleobis and Biton, kouroi of the Archaic period, c. 580 BC. Delphi Archaeological Museum.

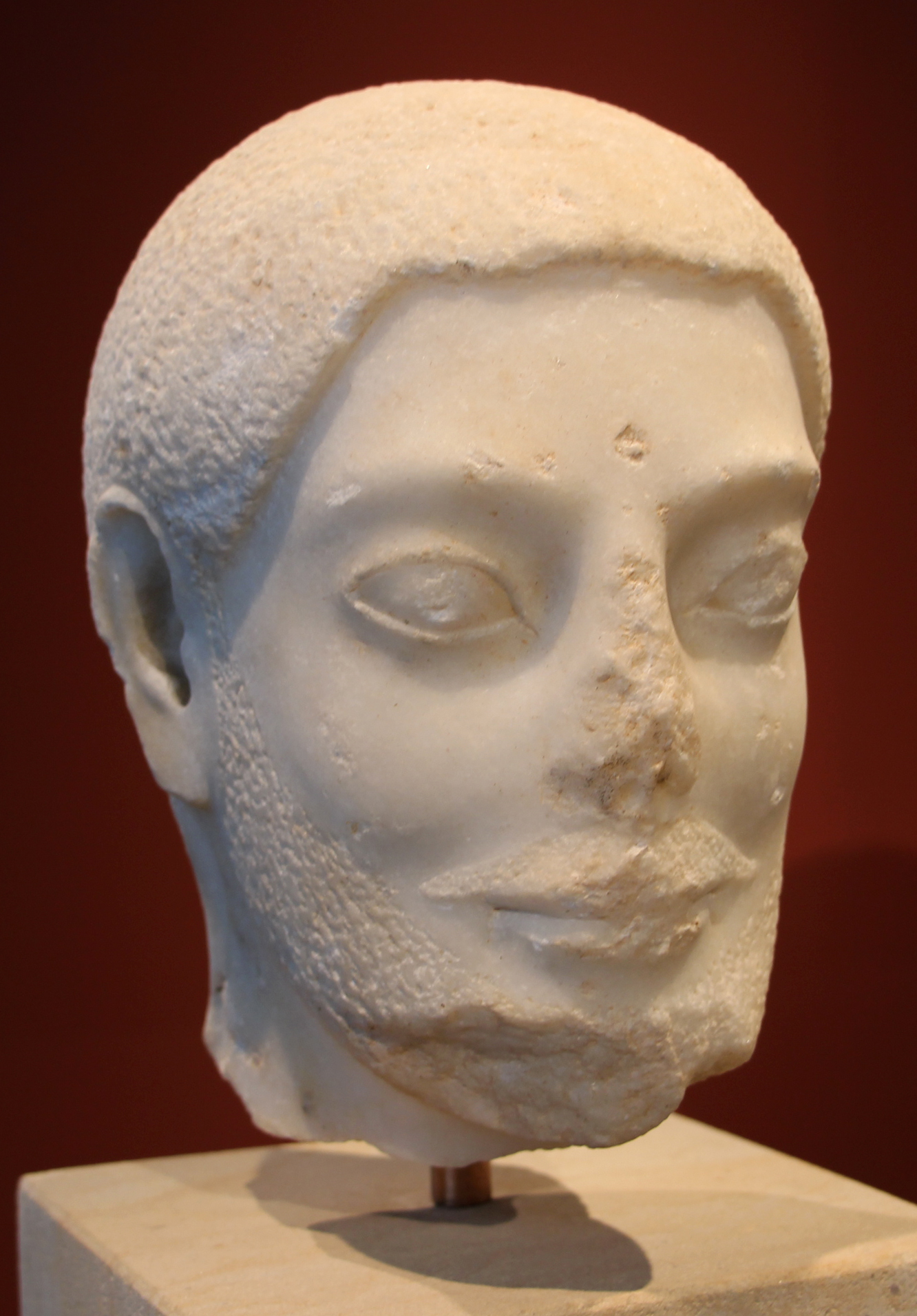
The Sabouroff head, an important example of Late Archaic Greek marble sculpture, and a precursor of true portraiture, c. 550-525 BCE.

Inspired by the monumental stone sculpture of ancient Egypt and Mesopotamia, the Greeks began again to carve in stone. Free-standing figures share the solidity and frontal stance characteristic of Eastern models, but their forms are more dynamic than those of Egyptian sculpture, as for example the Lady of Auxerre and Torso of Hera (Early Archaic period, c. 660–580 BC, both in the Louvre, Paris). After about 575 BC, figures such as these, both male and female, began wearing the so-called archaic smile. This expression, which has no specific appropriateness to the person or situation depicted, may have been a device to give the figures a distinctive human characteristic.

Three types of figures prevailed—the standing nude male youth (kouros, plural kouroi), the standing draped girl (kore, plural korai), and the seated woman. All emphasize and generalize the essential features of the human figure and show an increasingly accurate comprehension of human anatomy. The youths were either sepulchral or votive statues. Examples are Apollo (Metropolitan Museum of Art, New York), an early work; the Strangford Apollo from Anafi (British Museum), a much later work; and the Anavyssos Kouros (National Archaeological Museum of Athens). More of the musculature and skeletal structure is visible in this statue than in earlier works. The standing, draped girls have a wide range of expression, as in the sculptures in the Acropolis Museum of Athens. Their drapery is carved and painted with the delicacy and meticulousness common in the details of sculpture of this period.

The Greeks thus decided very early on that the human form was the most important subject for artistic endeavour. Seeing their gods as having human form, there was no distinction between the sacred and the secular in art—the human body was both secular and sacred. A male nude without any attachments such as a bow or a club, could just as easily be Apollo or Heracles as that year's Olympic boxing champion. In the Archaic Period, the most important sculptural form was the kouros (See for example Biton and Kleobis). The kore was also common; Greek art did not present female nudity (unless the intention was pornographic) until the 4th century BC, although the development of techniques to represent drapery is obviously important.

As with pottery, the Greeks did not produce sculpture merely for artistic display. Statues were commissioned either by aristocratic individuals or by the state, and used for public memorials, as offerings to temples, oracles and sanctuaries (as is frequently shown by inscriptions on the statues), or as markers for graves. Statues in the Archaic period were not all intended to represent specific individuals. They were depictions of an ideal—beauty, piety, honor or sacrifice. These were always depictions of young men, ranging in age from adolescence to early maturity, even when placed on the graves of (presumably) elderly citizens. Kouroi were all stylistically similar. Graduations in the social stature of the person commissioning the statue were indicated by size rather than artistic innovations.

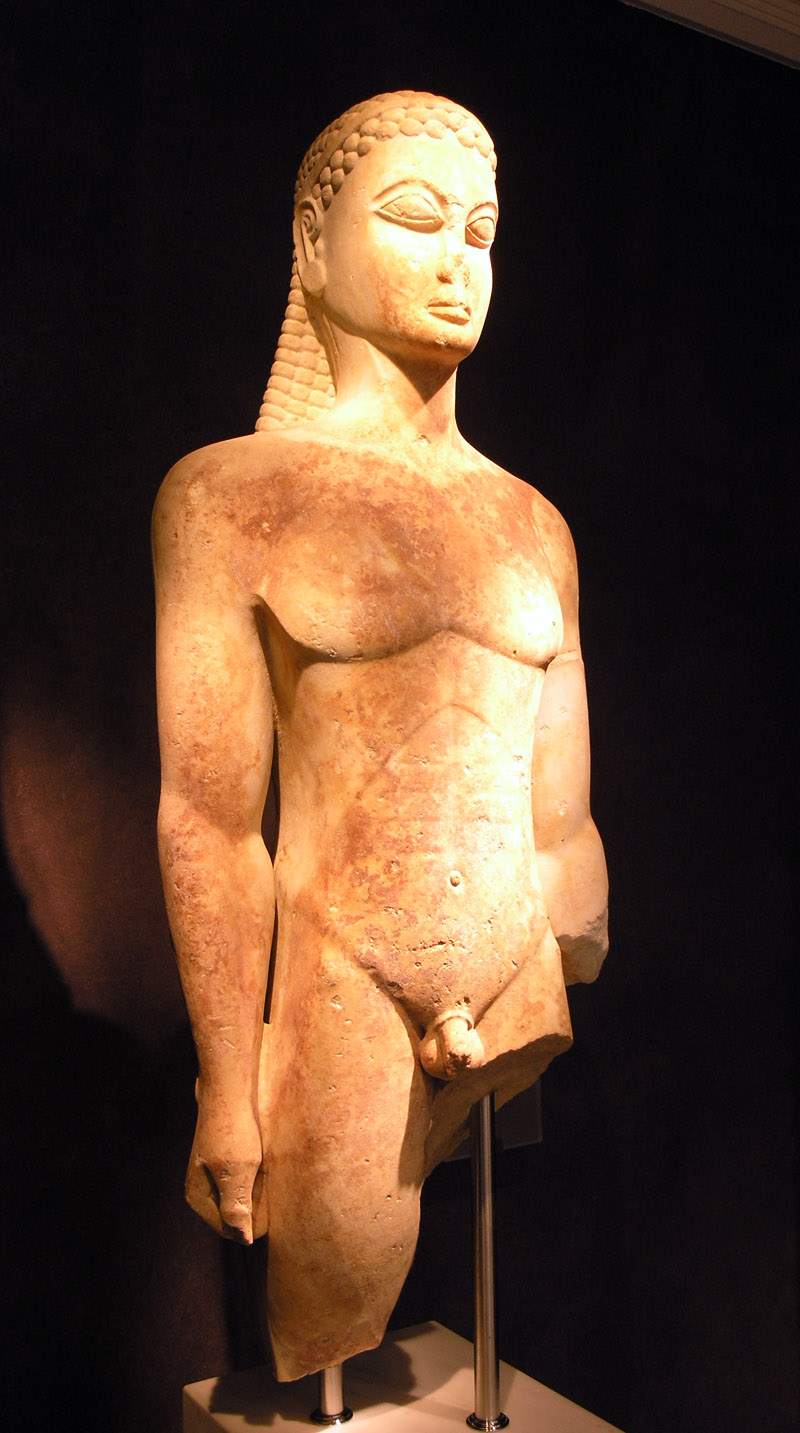
Dipylon Kouros, c. 600 BC, Athens, Kerameikos Museum.

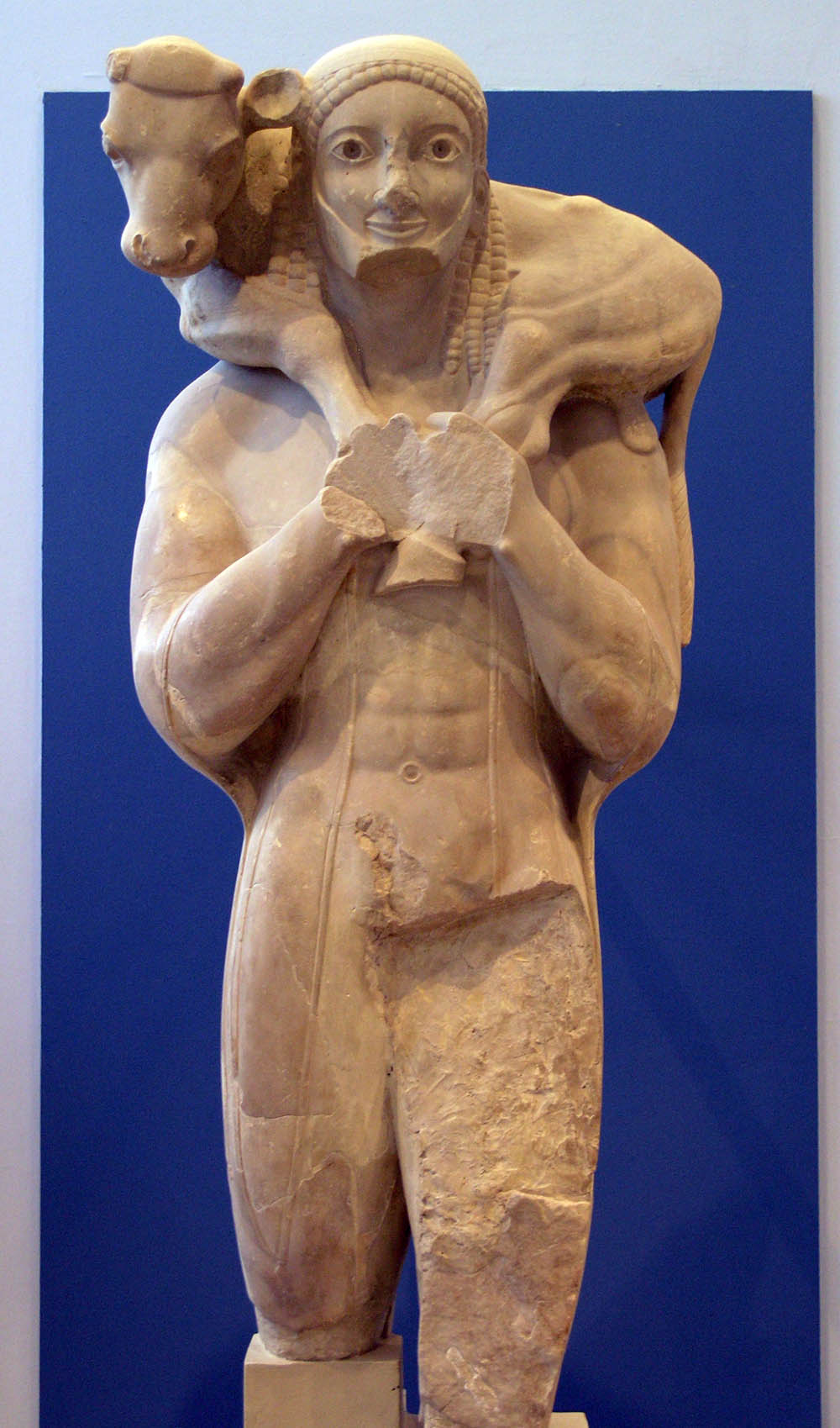
The Moschophoros or calf-bearer, c. 570 BC, Athens, Acropolis Museum.

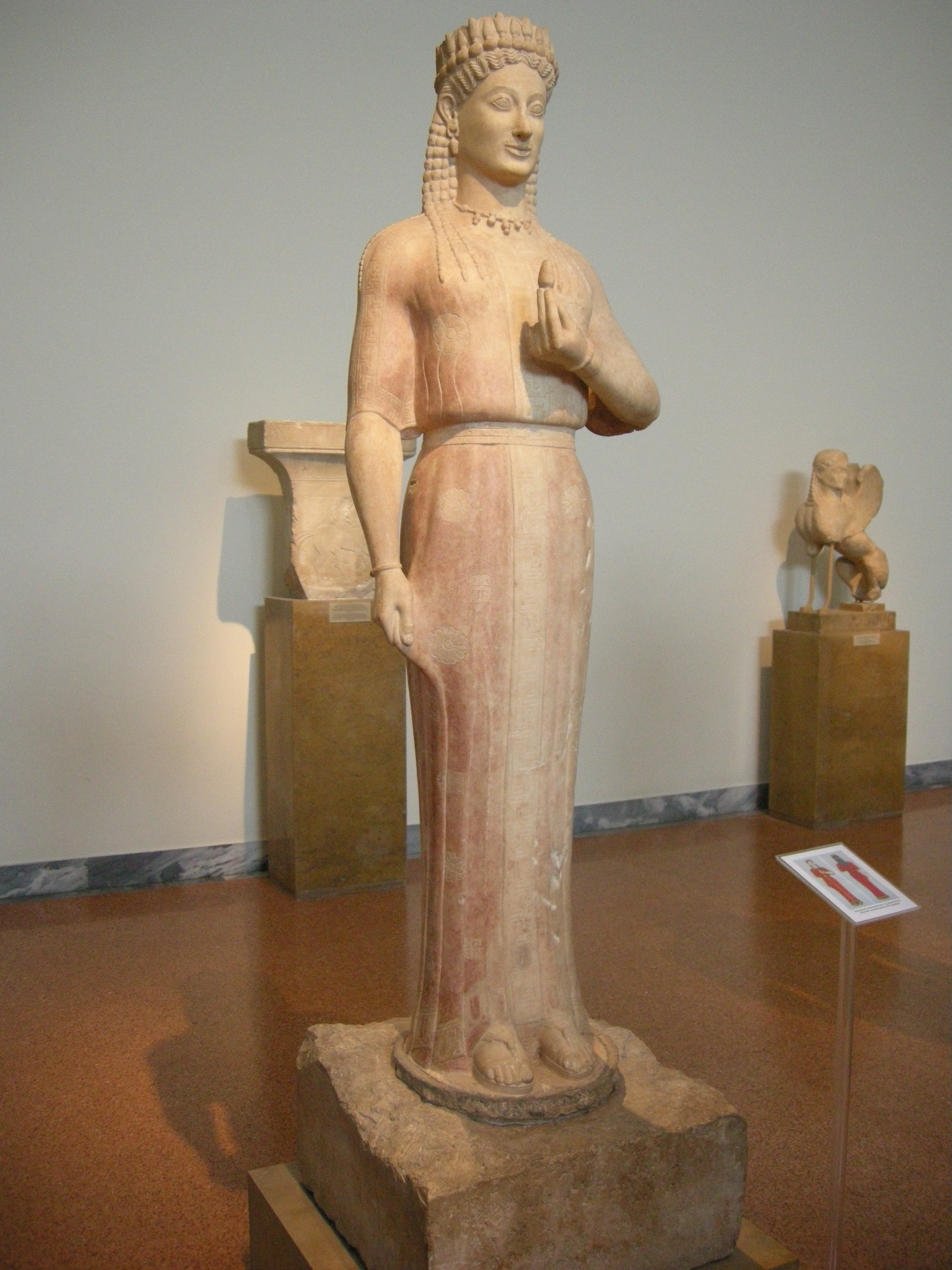
Phrasikleia Kore, c. 550 BC, Athens, National Archaeological Museum of Athens.

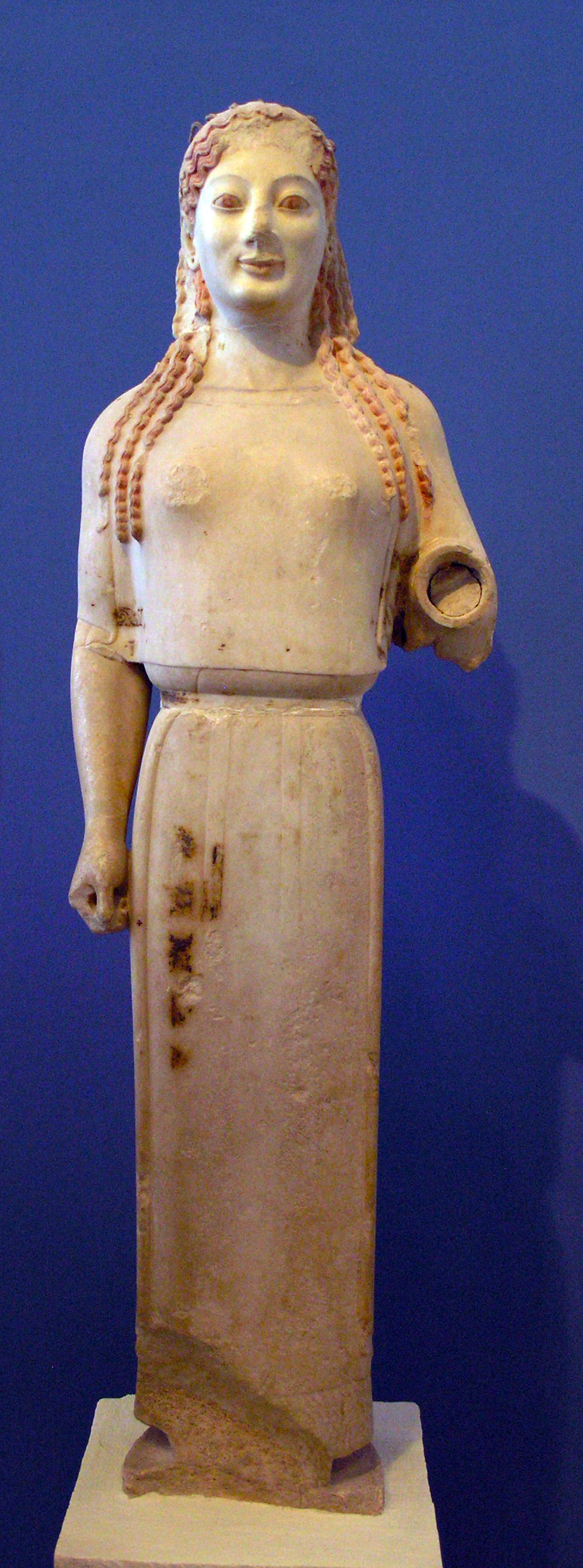
Peplos Kore, c. 530 BC, Athens, Acropolis Museum.

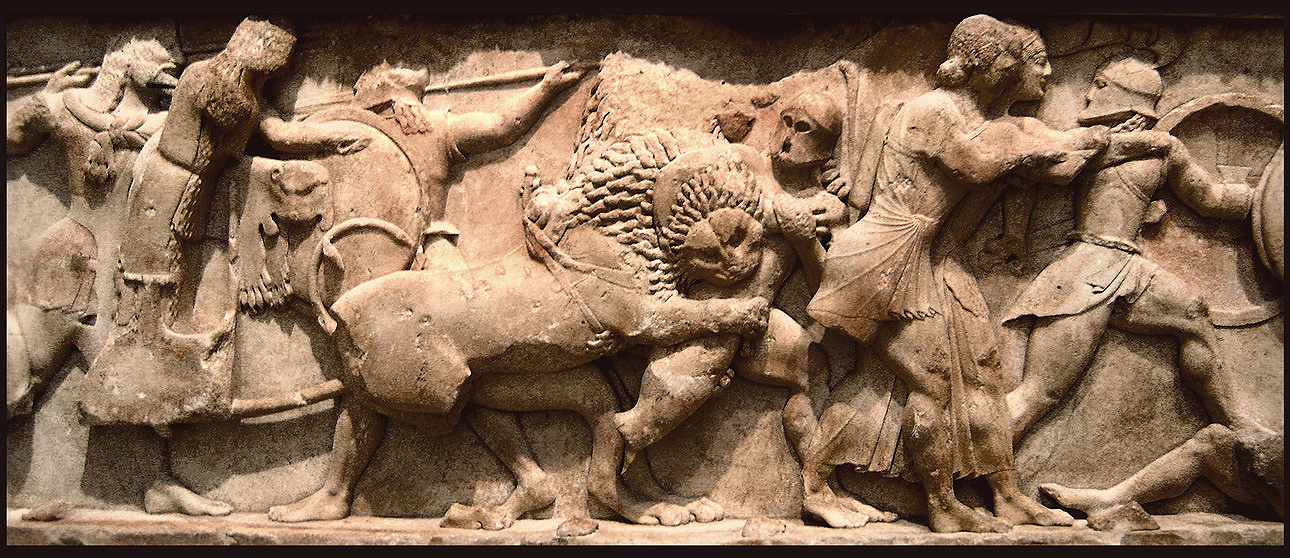
Frieze of the Siphnian Treasury, Delphi, depicting a Gigantomachy, c. 525 BC, Delphi Archaeological Museum.

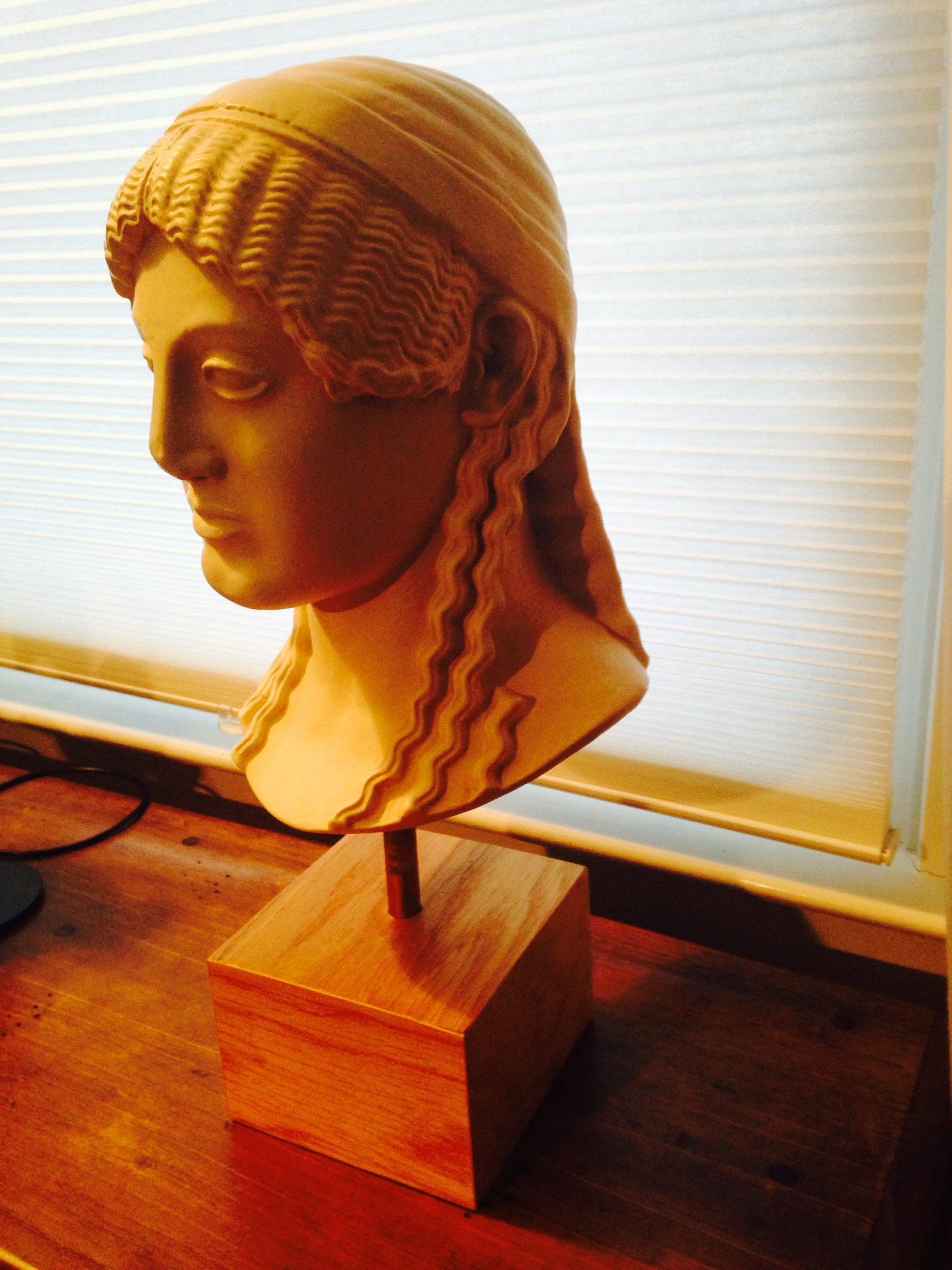
Euthydikos Kore. c. 490 BC, Athens, authorized replica, original in National Archaeological Museum of Athens

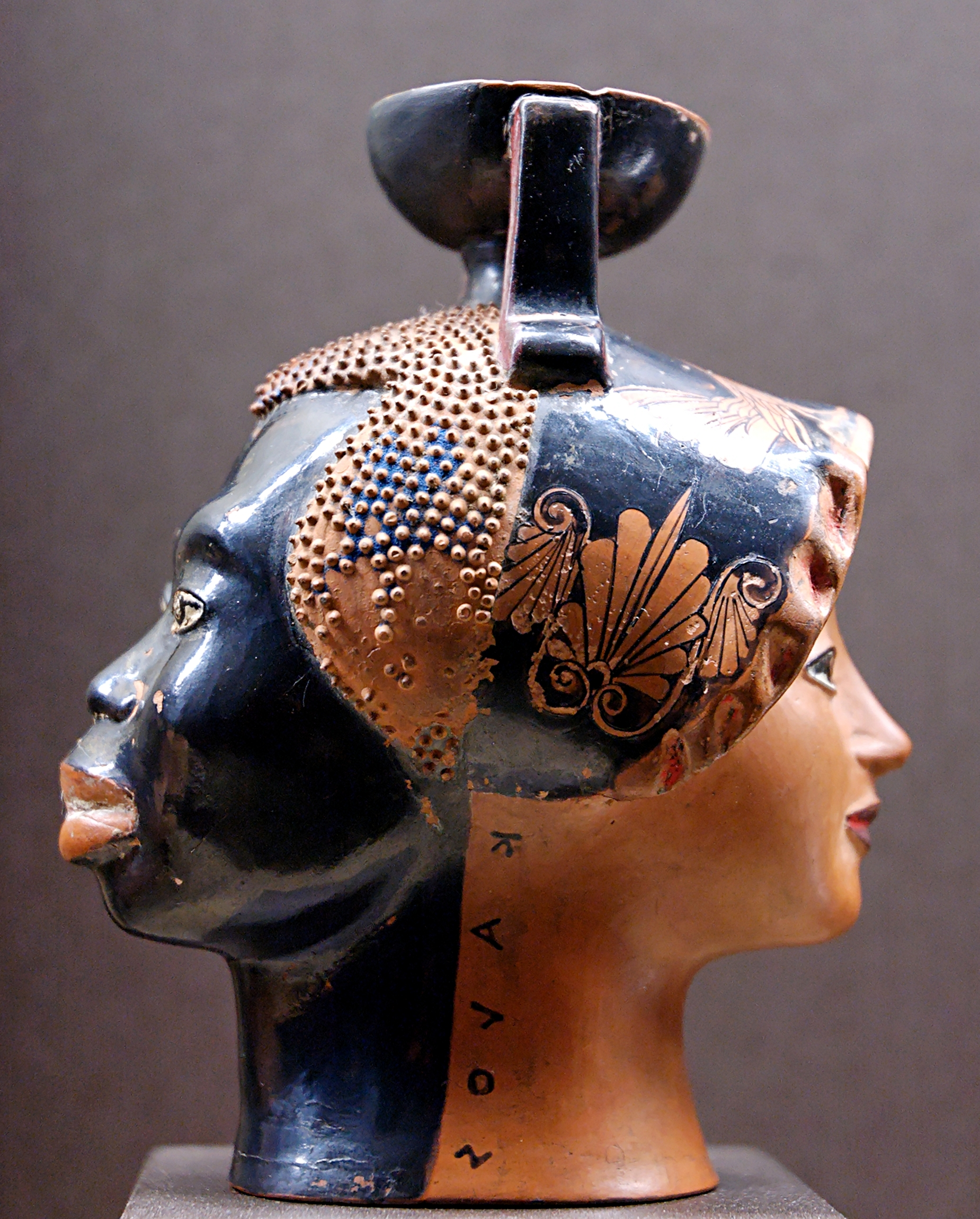
An Ethiopian's head and female head, with a kalos inscription. Attic Greek janiform red-figure aryballos, c. 520–510 BC.

=== Classical ===
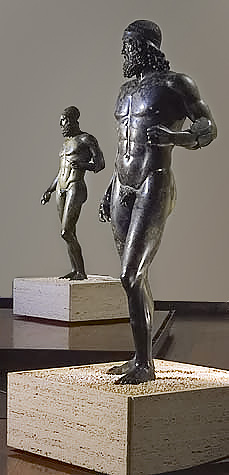
Riace bronzes, examples of proto classic bronze sculpture, Museo Nazionale della Magna Grecia, Reggio Calabria

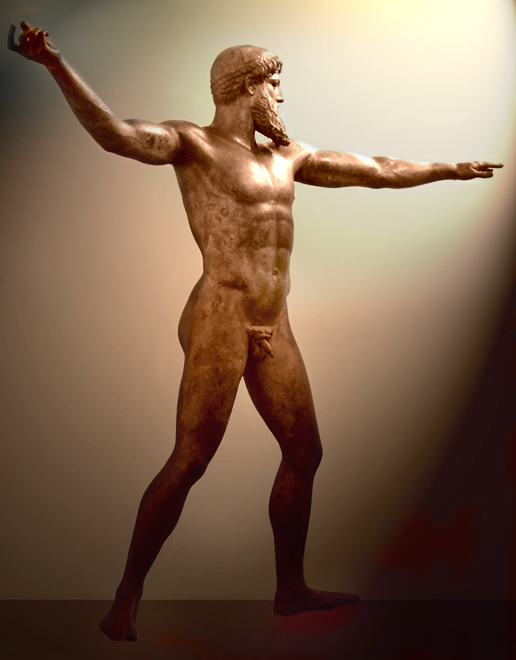
Artemision Bronze, thought to be either Poseidon or Zeus, c. 460 BC, National Archaeological Museum, Athens. Found by fishermen off the coast of Cape Artemisium in 1928. The figure is more than 2 m in height.

The Classical period saw a revolution of Greek sculpture, sometimes associated by historians with the popular culture surrounding the introduction of democracy and the end of the aristocratic culture associated with the kouroi. The Classical period saw changes in the style and function of sculpture, along with a dramatic increase in the technical skill of Greek sculptors in depicting realistic human forms. Poses also became more naturalistic, notably during the beginning of the period. This is embodied in works such as the Kritios Boy (480 BC), sculpted with the earliest known use of contrapposto ('counterpose'), and the Charioteer of Delphi (474 BC), which demonstrates a transition to more naturalistic sculpture. From about 500 BC, Greek statues began increasingly to depict real people, as opposed to vague interpretations of myth or entirely fictional votive statues, although the style in which they were represented had not yet developed into a realistic form of portraiture. The statues of Harmodius and Aristogeiton, set up in Athens mark the overthrow of the aristocratic tyranny, and have been said to be the first public monuments to show actual individuals.

The Classical Period also saw an increase in the use of statues and sculptures as decorations of buildings. The characteristic temples of the Classical era, such as the Parthenon in Athens, and the Temple of Zeus at Olympia, used relief sculpture for decorative friezes, and pedimental sculpture in the round to fill the triangular fields of the pediments. The difficult aesthetic and technical challenge stimulated much in the way of sculptural innovation. Most of these works survive only in fragments, for example the Parthenon Marbles, roughly half of which are in the British Museum.

Funeral statuary evolved during this period from the rigid and impersonal kouros of the Archaic period to the highly personal family groups of the Classical period. These monuments are commonly found in the suburbs of Athens, which in ancient times were cemeteries on the outskirts of the city. Although some of them depict "ideal" types—the mourning mother, the dutiful son—they increasingly depicted real people, typically showing the departed taking his dignified leave from his family. This is a notable increase in the level of emotion relative to the Archaic and Geometrical eras.

Another notable change is the rise of giving artistic credit to sculptors. The entirety of information known about sculpture in the Archaic and Geometrical periods are centred upon the works themselves, and seldom, if ever, on the sculptors. Examples include Phidias, known to have overseen the design and building of the Parthenon, and Praxiteles, whose nude female sculptures were the first to be considered artistically respectable. Praxiteles' Aphrodite of Knidos, which survives in copies, was praised by Pliny the Elder.

Lysistratus is said to have been the first to use plaster moulds taken from living people to produce lost-wax portraits, and to have also developed a technique of casting from existing statues. He came from a family of sculptors and his brother, Lysippos of Sicyon, is supposed to have produced fifteen hundred statues in his career.

The Statue of Zeus at Olympia and the Statue of Athena Parthenos (both chryselephantine and executed by Phidias or under his direction, and considered to be the greatest of the Classical Sculptures), are lost, although smaller copies (in other materials) and good descriptions of both still exist. Their size and magnificence prompted rivals to seize them in the Byzantine period, and both were removed to Constantinople, where they were later destroyed.

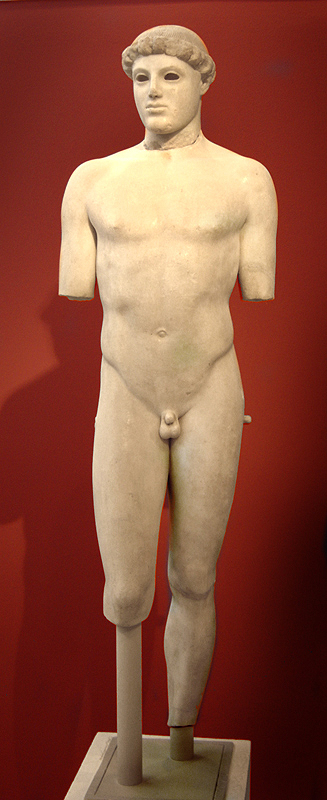
Kritios Boy. Marble, c. 480 BC. Acropolis Museum, Athens.

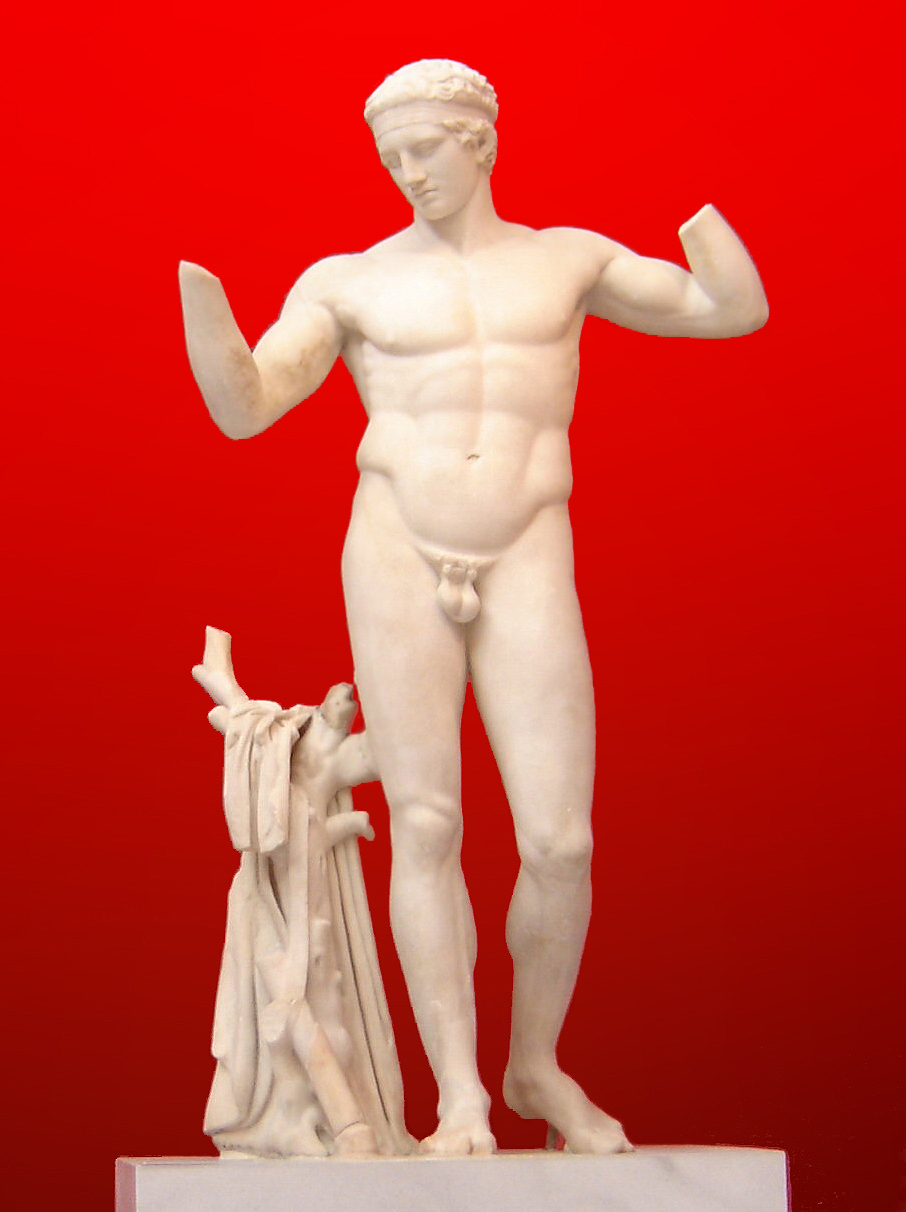
Copy of Polyclitus' Diadumenos, National Archaeological Museum, Athens.

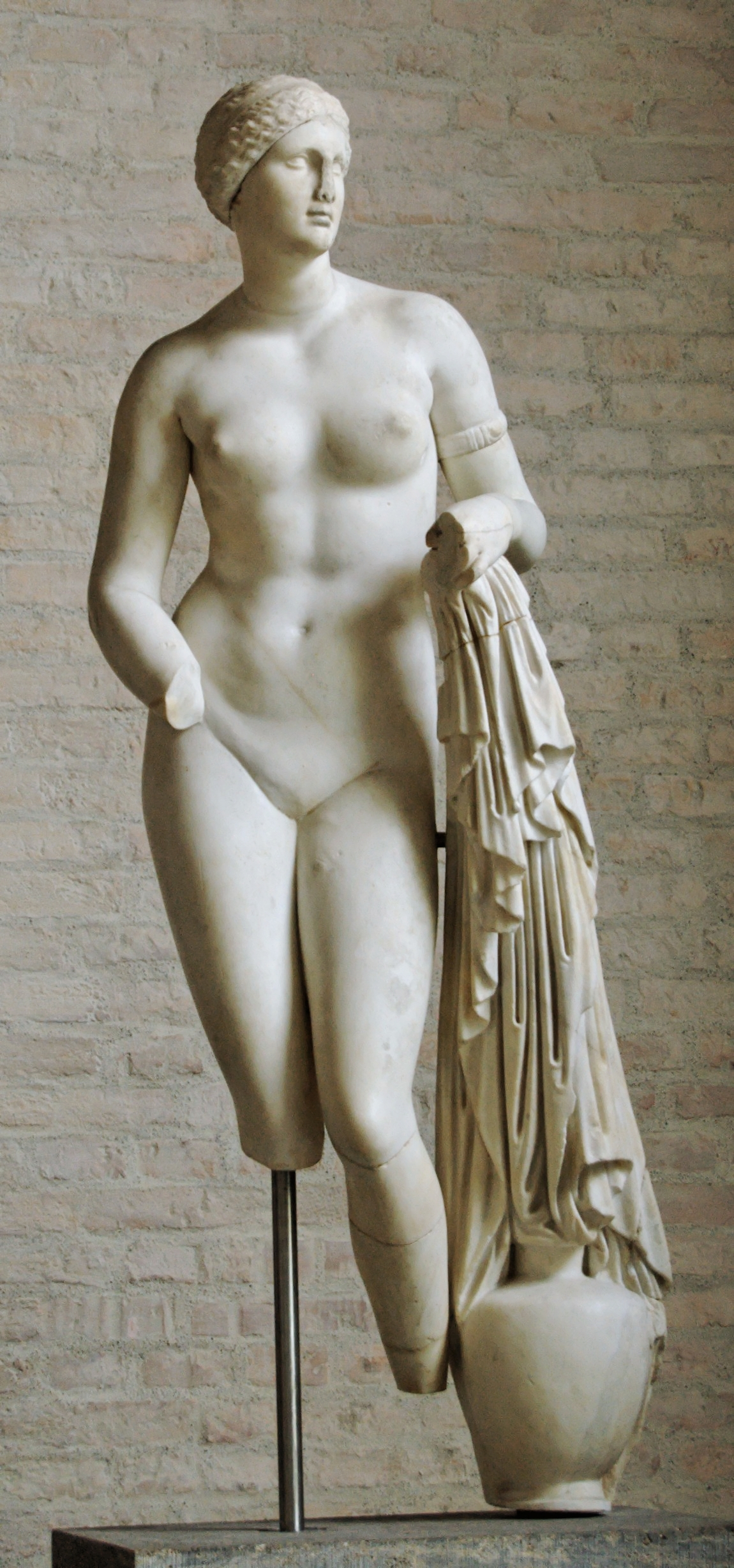
So-called Venus Braschi by Praxiteles, type of the Knidian Aphrodite, Munich Glyptothek.

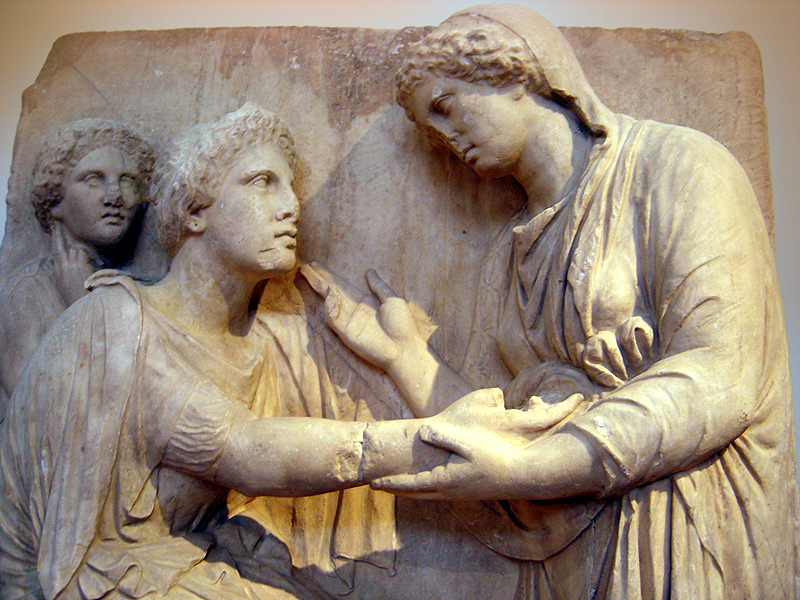
Family group on a grave marker from Athens, National Archaeological Museum, Athens

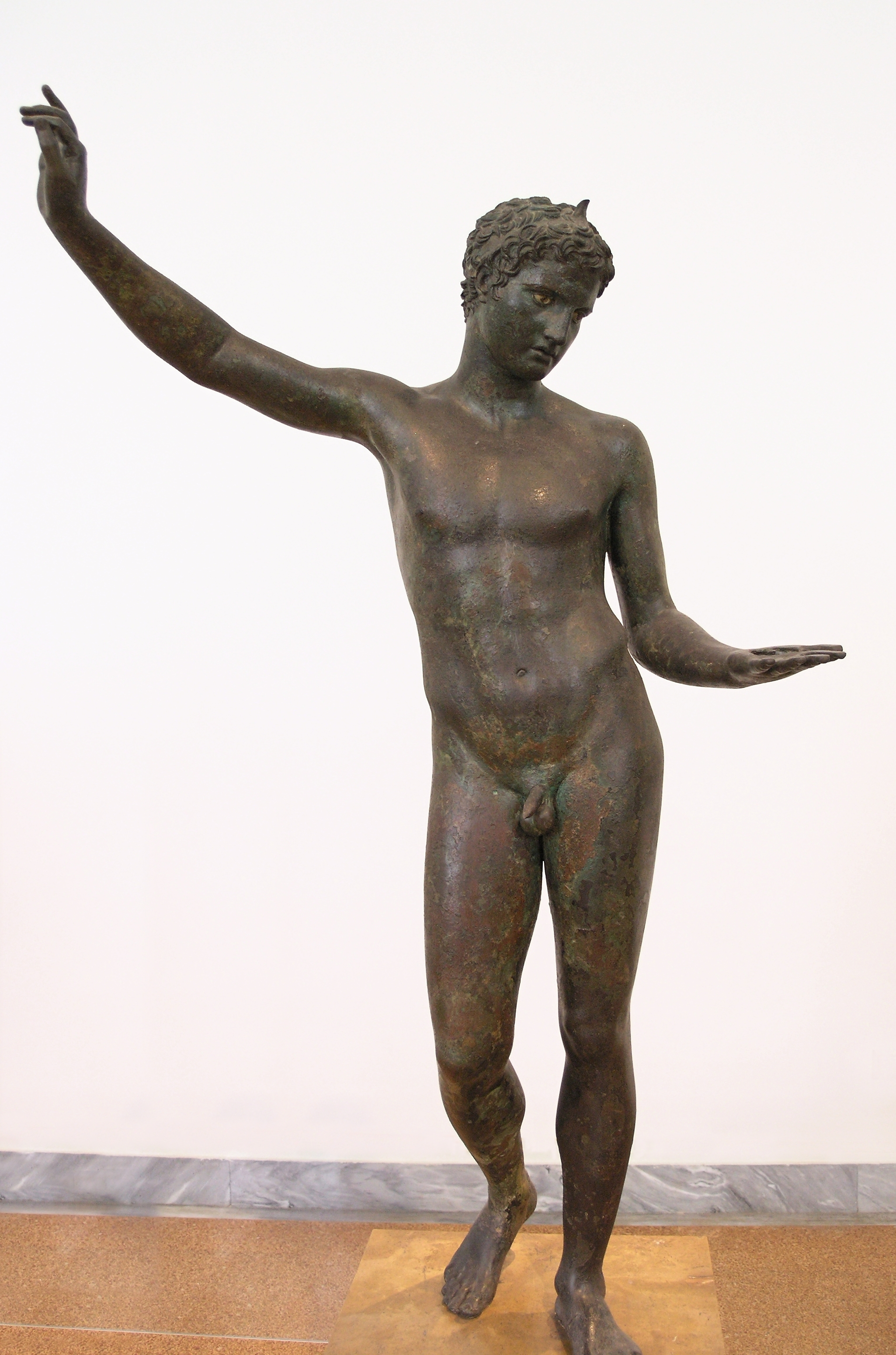
The Marathon Youth, 4th century BC bronze statue, possibly by Praxiteles, National Archaeological Museum, Athens.

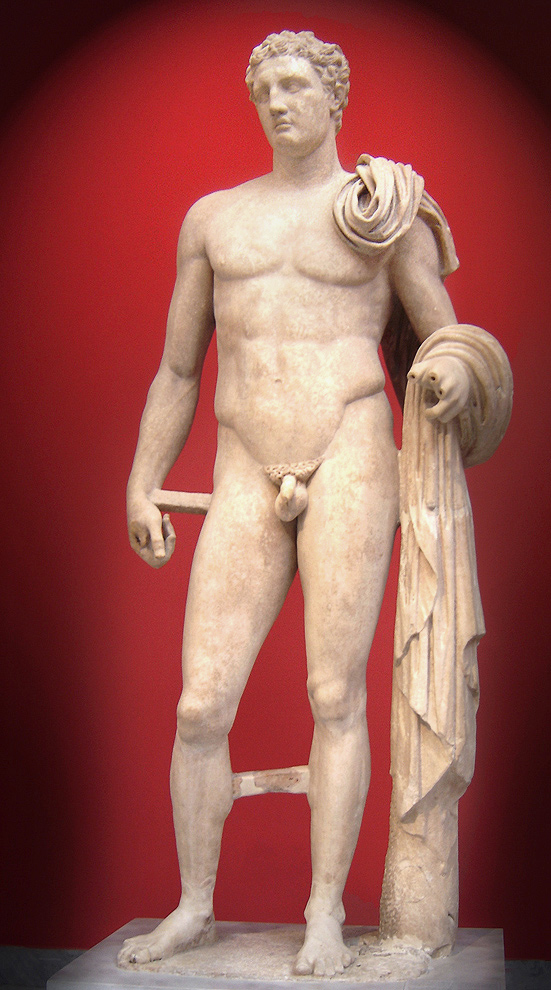
Atalante Hermes, possibly by Lysippos, National Archaeological Museum, Athens.

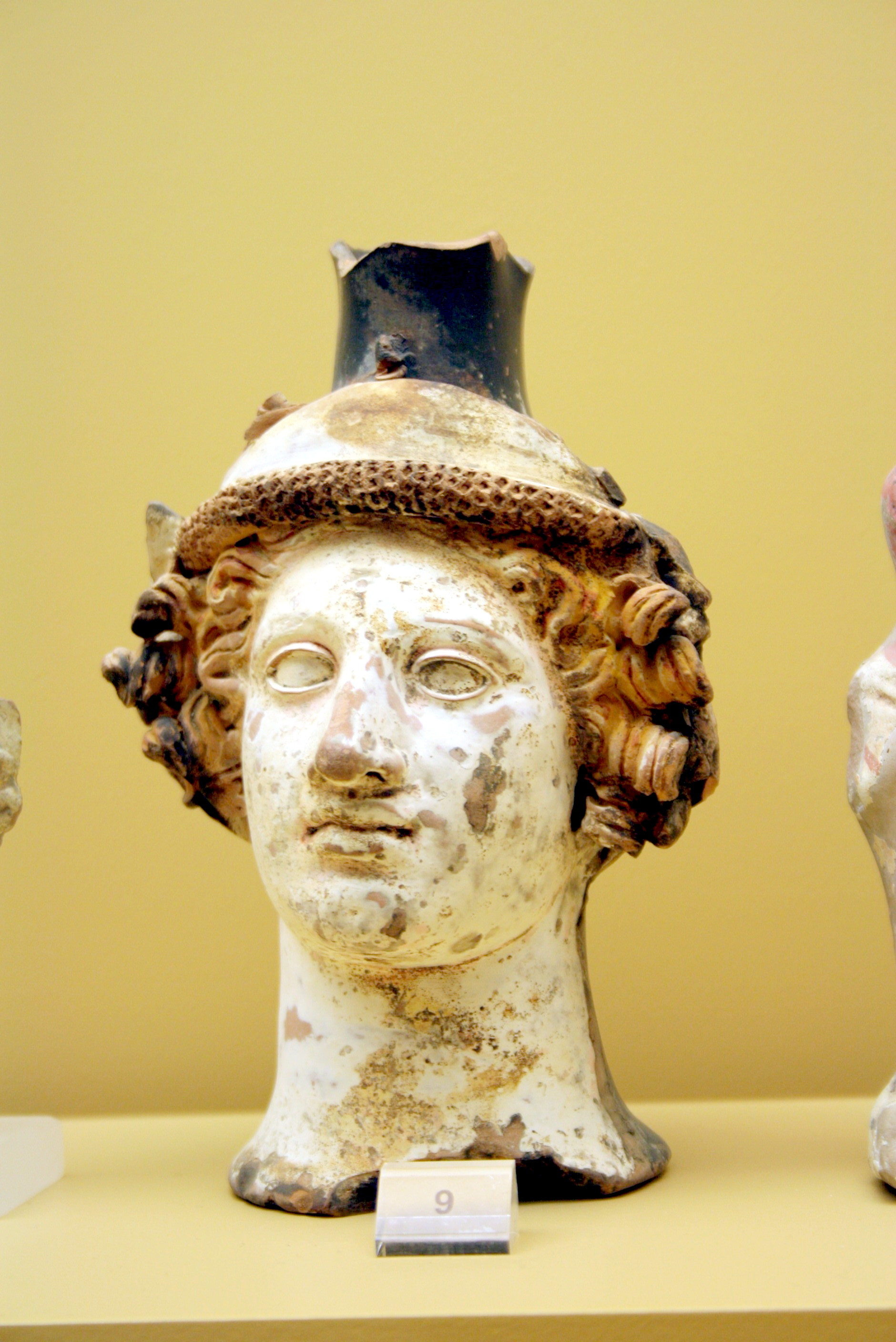
Terracotta vase in the shape of Dionysus' head, c. 410 BC; on display in the Ancient Agora Museum in Athens, housed in the Stoa of Attalus

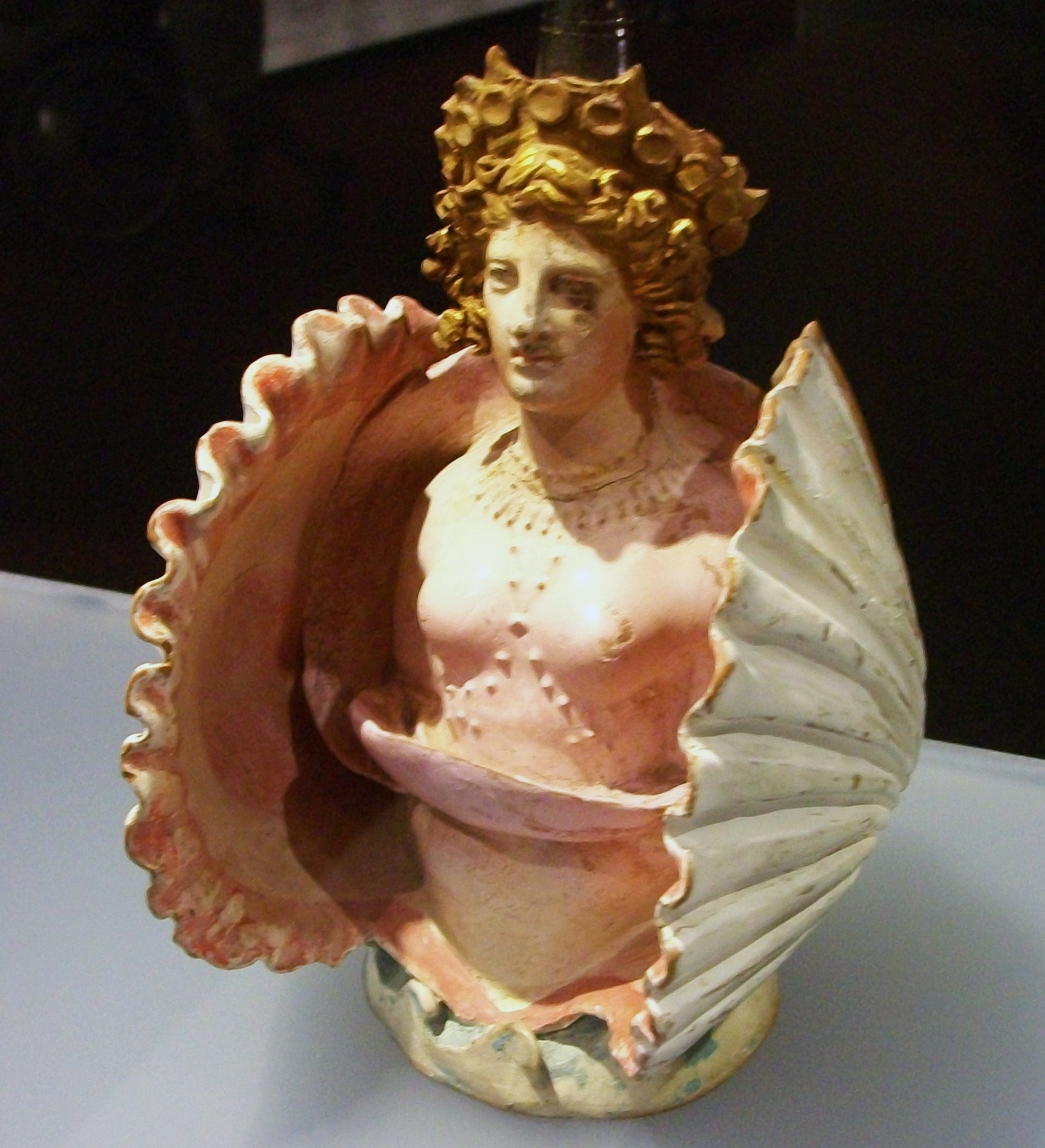
Pottery vessel, Aphrodite inside a shell; from Attica, Classical Greece, discovered in the Phanagoria cemetery, Taman Peninsula (Bosporan Kingdom, southern Russia), early 4th century BC, Hermitage Museum, Saint Petersburg.

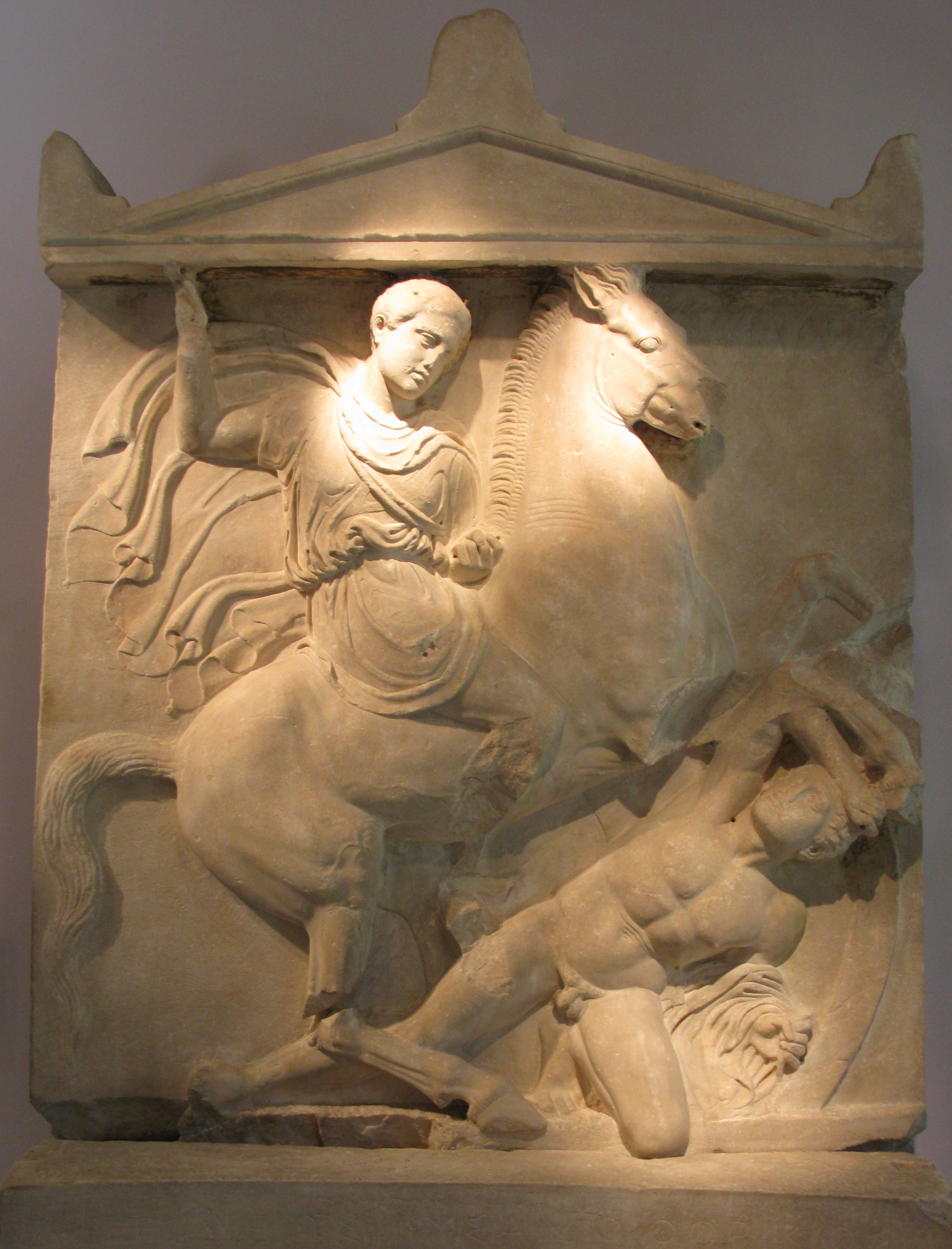
Athenian cavalryman Dexileos fighting a naked hoplite in the Corinthian War. Dexileos was killed in action near Corinth in the summer of 394 BC, probably in the Battle of Nemea, or in a proximate engagement. Grave Stele of Dexileos, 394-393 BC.

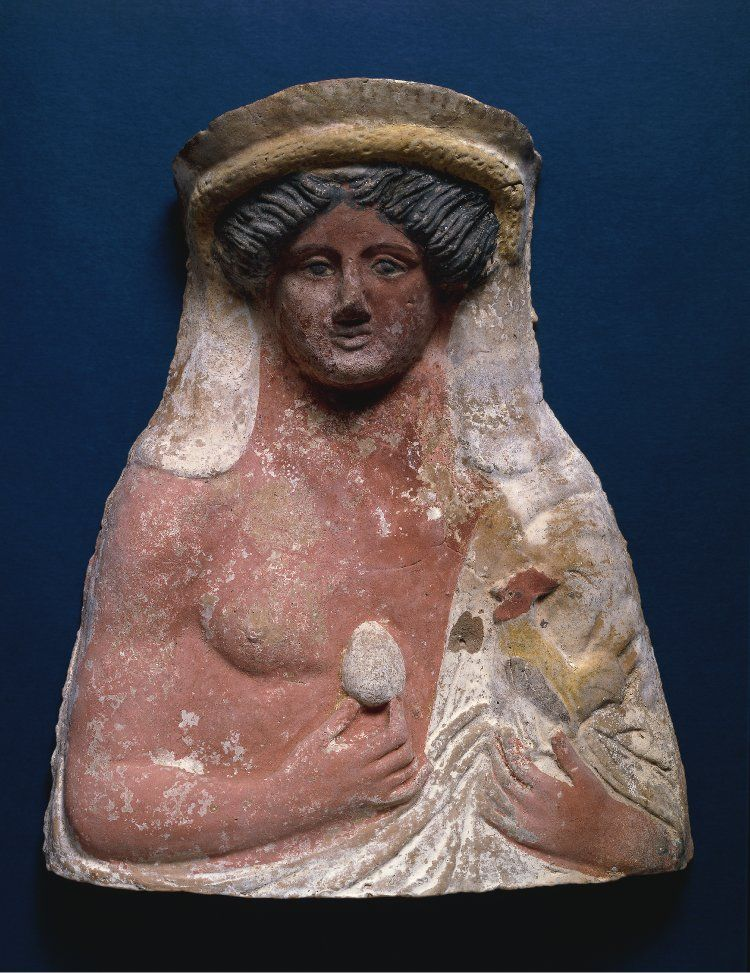
Dionysus holding an egg and a cock, terracotta from Tanagra, Greece, c. 350 BC

=== Hellenistic ===
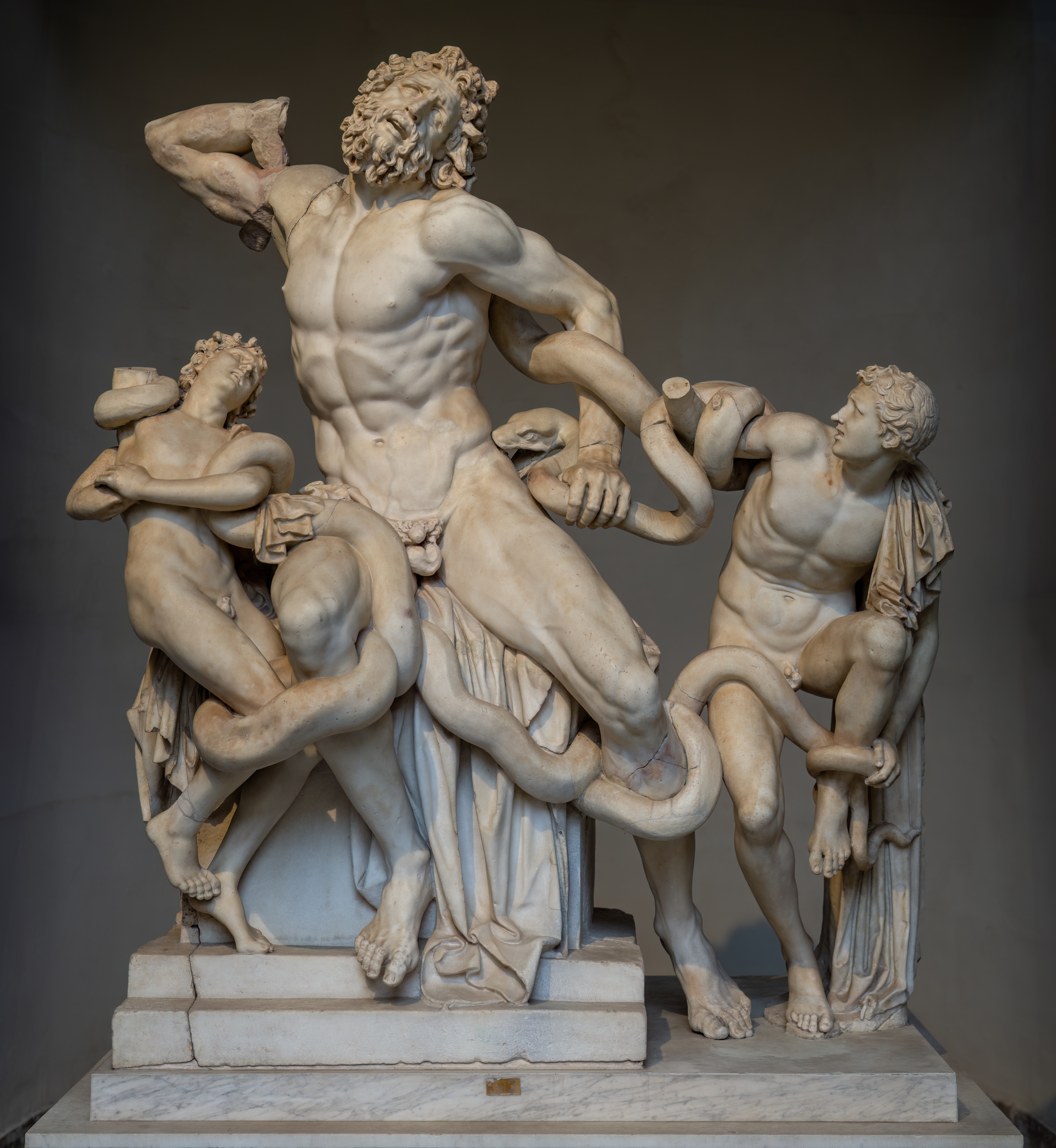
Laocoön and His Sons (Late Hellenistic), Vatican Museum

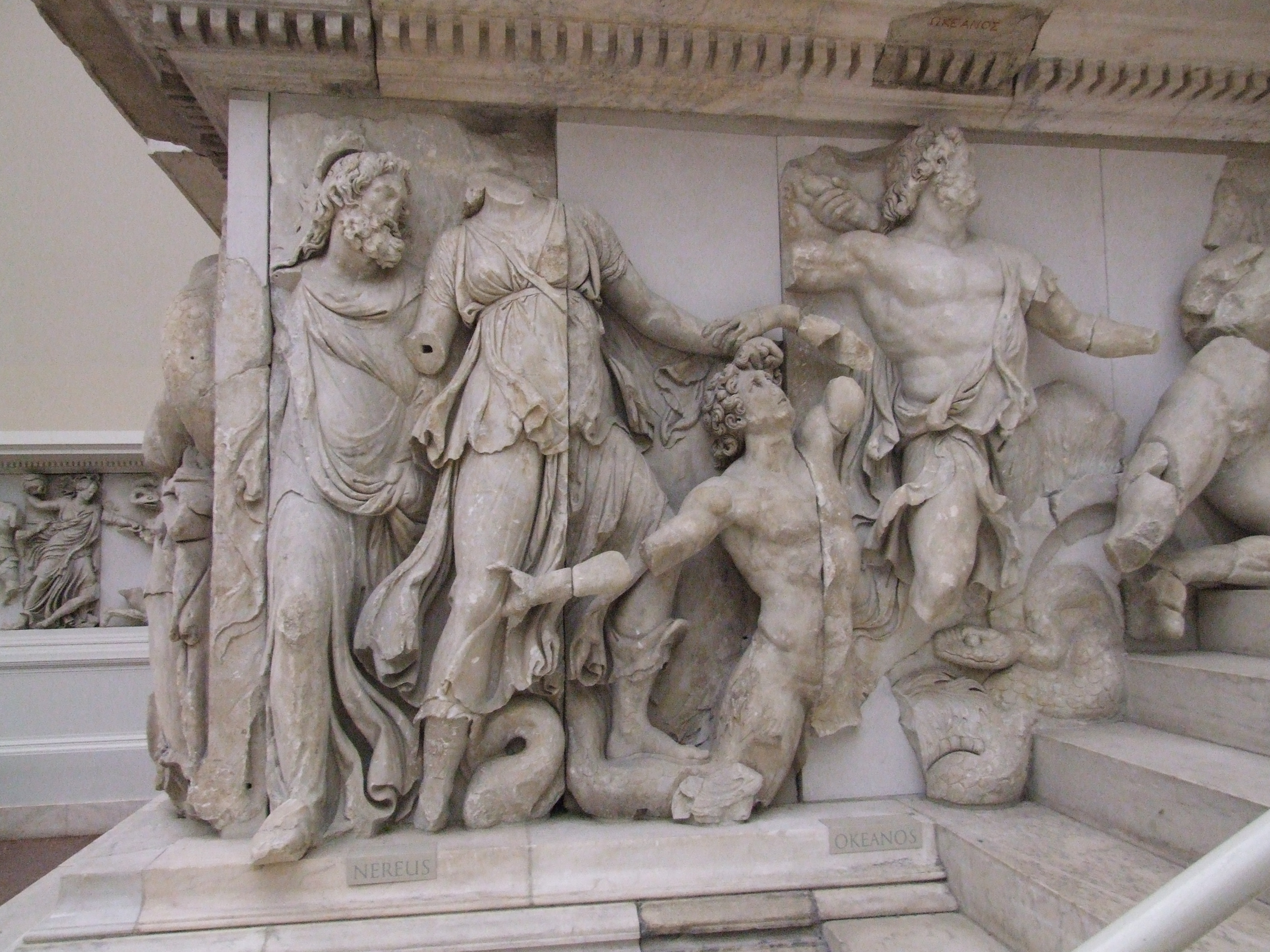
The Hellenistic Pergamon Altar: l to r Nereus, Doris, a Giant, Oceanus

The transition from the Classical to the Hellenistic period occurred during the 4th century BC. Greek art became increasingly diverse, influenced by the cultures of the peoples drawn into the Greek orbit, by the conquests of Alexander the Great (336 to 323 BC). In the view of some art historians, this is described as a decline in quality and originality; however, individuals of the time may not have shared this outlook. Many sculptures previously considered classical masterpieces are now known to be of the Hellenistic age. The technical ability of the Hellenistic sculptors are clearly in evidence in such major works as the Winged Victory of Samothrace, and the Pergamon Altar. New centres of Greek culture, particularly in sculpture, developed in Alexandria, Antioch, Pergamum, and other cities. By the 2nd century BC, the rising power of Rome had also absorbed much of the Greek tradition—and an increasing proportion of its products as well.

During this period, sculpture again experienced a shift towards increasing naturalism. Common people, women, children, animals, and domestic scenes became acceptable subjects for sculpture, which was commissioned by wealthy families for the adornment of their homes and gardens. Realistic figures of men and women of all ages were produced, and sculptors no longer felt obliged to depict people as ideals of beauty or physical perfection. At the same time, new Hellenistic cities springing up in Egypt, Syria, and Anatolia required statues depicting the gods and heroes of Greece for their temples and public places. This made sculpture, like pottery, an industry, with the consequent standardisation and (some) lowering of quality. For these reasons, quite a few more Hellenistic statues survive to the present than those of the Classical period.

Alongside the natural shift towards naturalism, there was a shift in expression of the sculptures as well. Sculptures began expressing more power and energy during this time period. An easy way to see the shift in expressions during the Hellenistic period would be to compare it to the sculptures of the Classical period. The classical period had sculptures such as the Charioteer of Delphi expressing humility. The sculptures of the Hellenistic period however saw greater expressions of power and energy as demonstrated in the Jockey of Artemision.

Some of the best known Hellenistic sculptures are the Winged Victory of Samothrace (2nd or 1st century BC), the statue of Aphrodite from the island of Melos known as the Venus de Milo (mid-2nd century BC), the Dying Gaul (about 230 BC), and the monumental group Laocoön and His Sons (late 1st century BC). All these statues depict Classical themes, but their treatment is far more sensuous and emotional than the austere taste of the Classical period would have allowed or its technical skills permitted. Hellenistic sculpture was also marked by an increase in scale, which culminated in the Colossus of Rhodes (late 3rd century), thought to have been roughly the same size as the Statue of Liberty. The combined effect of earthquakes and looting have destroyed this as well as any other very large works of this period that might have existed.

Discoveries made since the end of the 19th century surrounding the (now submerged) ancient Egyptian city of Heracleum include a 4th-century BC depiction of Isis. The depiction is unusually sensual for depictions of the Egyptian goddess, as well as being uncharacteristically detailed and feminine, marking a combination of Egyptian and Hellenistic forms around the time of Alexander the Great's conquest of Egypt.

Following the conquests of Alexander the Great, Greek culture spread as far as India, as revealed by the excavations of Ai-Khanoum in eastern Afghanistan, and the civilization of the Greco-Bactrians and the Indo-Greeks. Greco-Buddhist art represented a syncretism between Greek art and the visual expression of Buddhism. Well south of thwe main areas of this, in Goa, India, Buddha statues in Greek styles were found. These are attributed to Greek converts to Buddhism, many of whom are known to have settled in Goa during Hellenistic times.

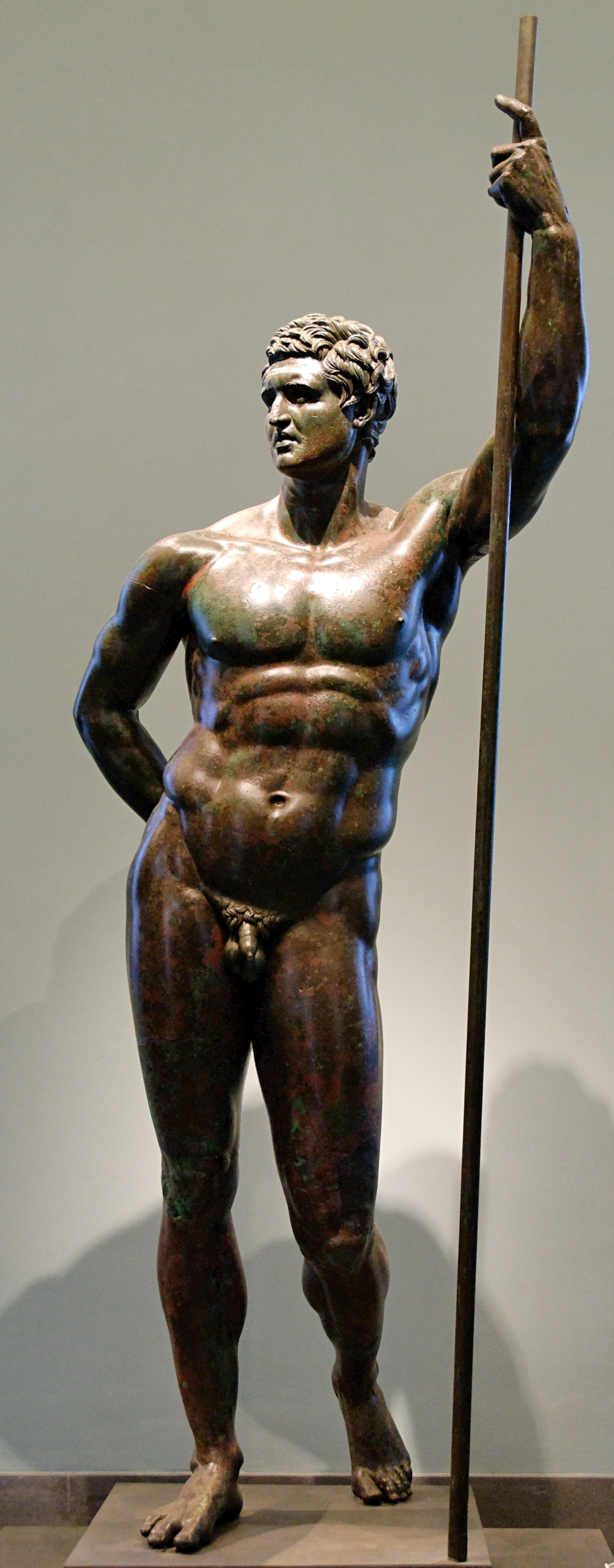
The Hellenistic Prince, a bronze statue originally thought to be a Seleucid, or Attalus II of Pergamon, now considered a portrait of a Roman general, made by a Greek artist working in Rome in the 2nd century BC.

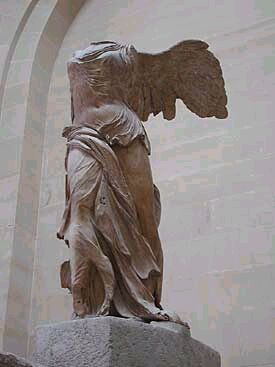
The Winged Victory of Samothrace (Hellenistic), The Louvre, Paris

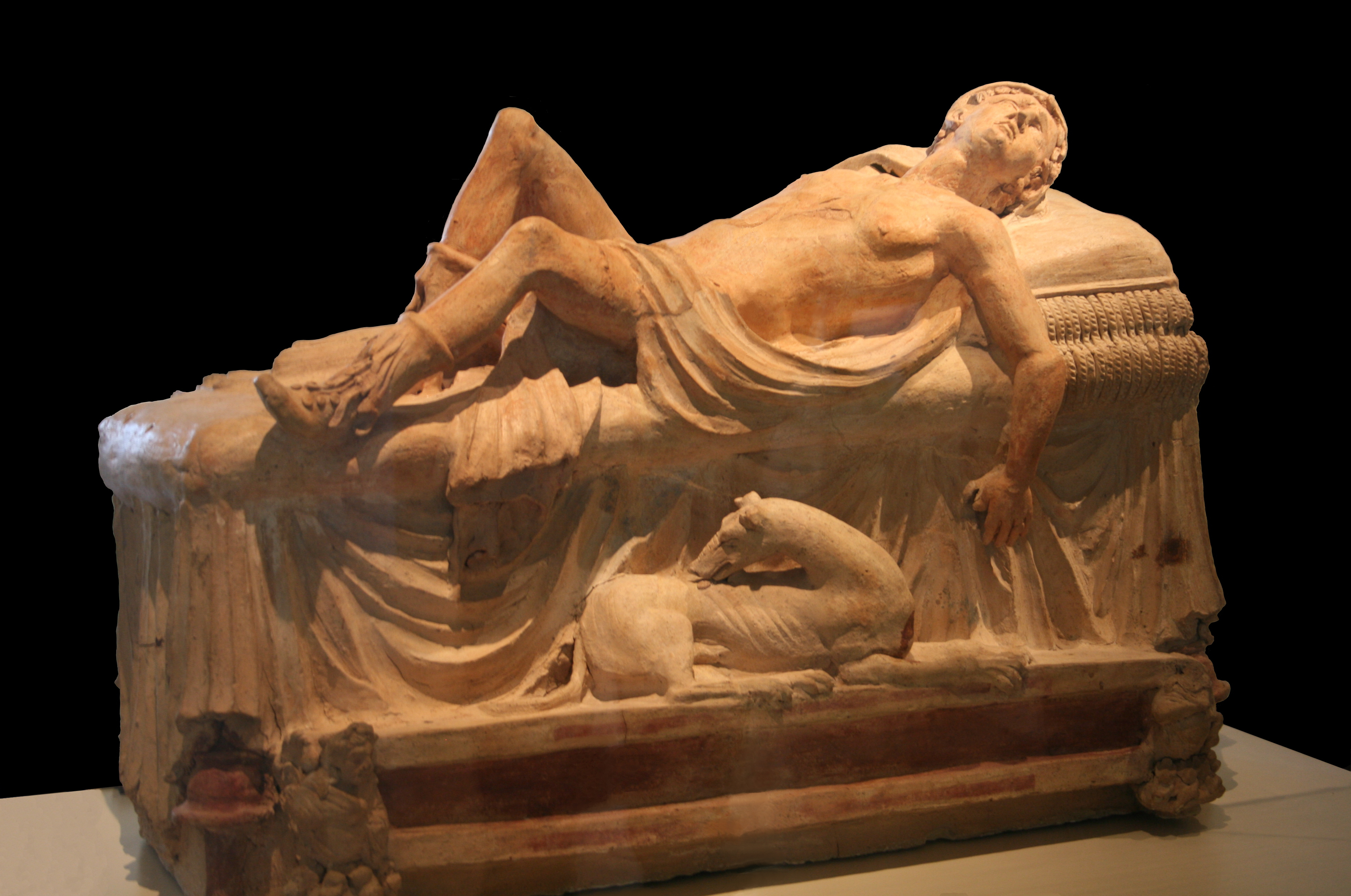
Sepulchral monument of a dying Adonis, polychrome terracotta, Etruscan art from Tuscana, 250-100 BC

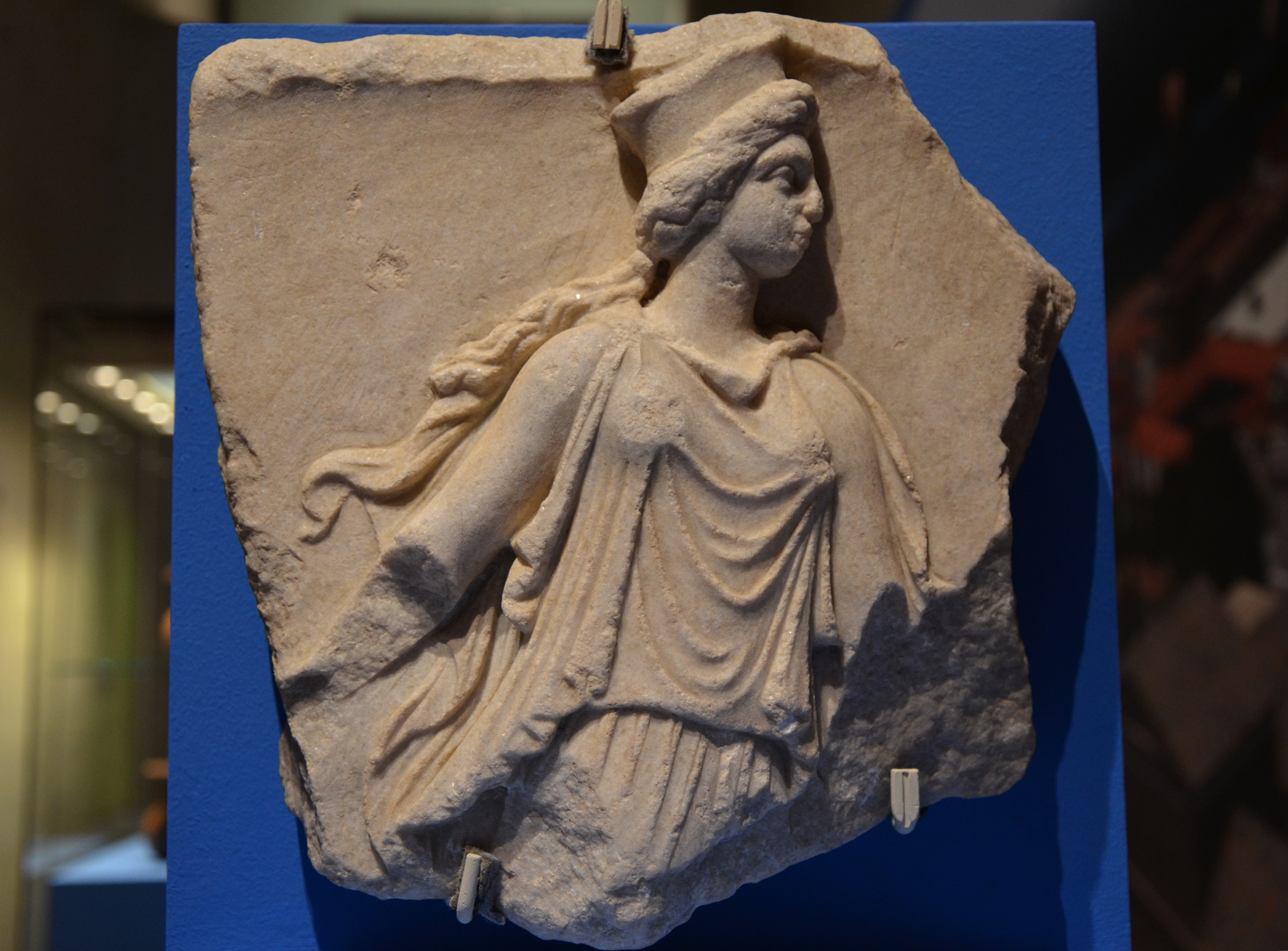
Fragment of a marble relief depicting a Kore, 3rd century BC, from Panticapaeum, Taurica (Crimea), Bosporan Kingdom

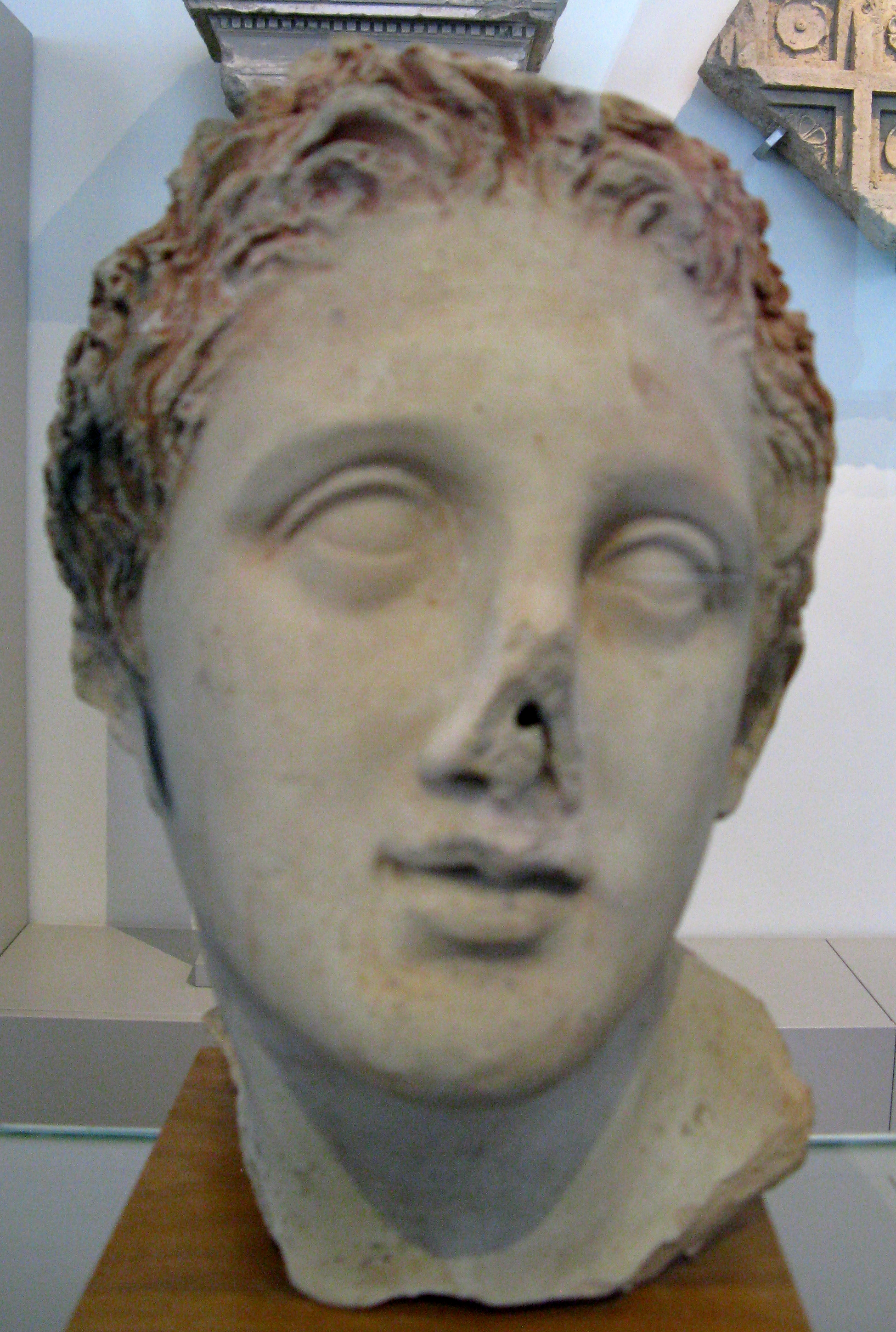
Ancient Greek terracotta head of a young man, found in Tarent, c. 300 BC, Antikensammlung Berlin.

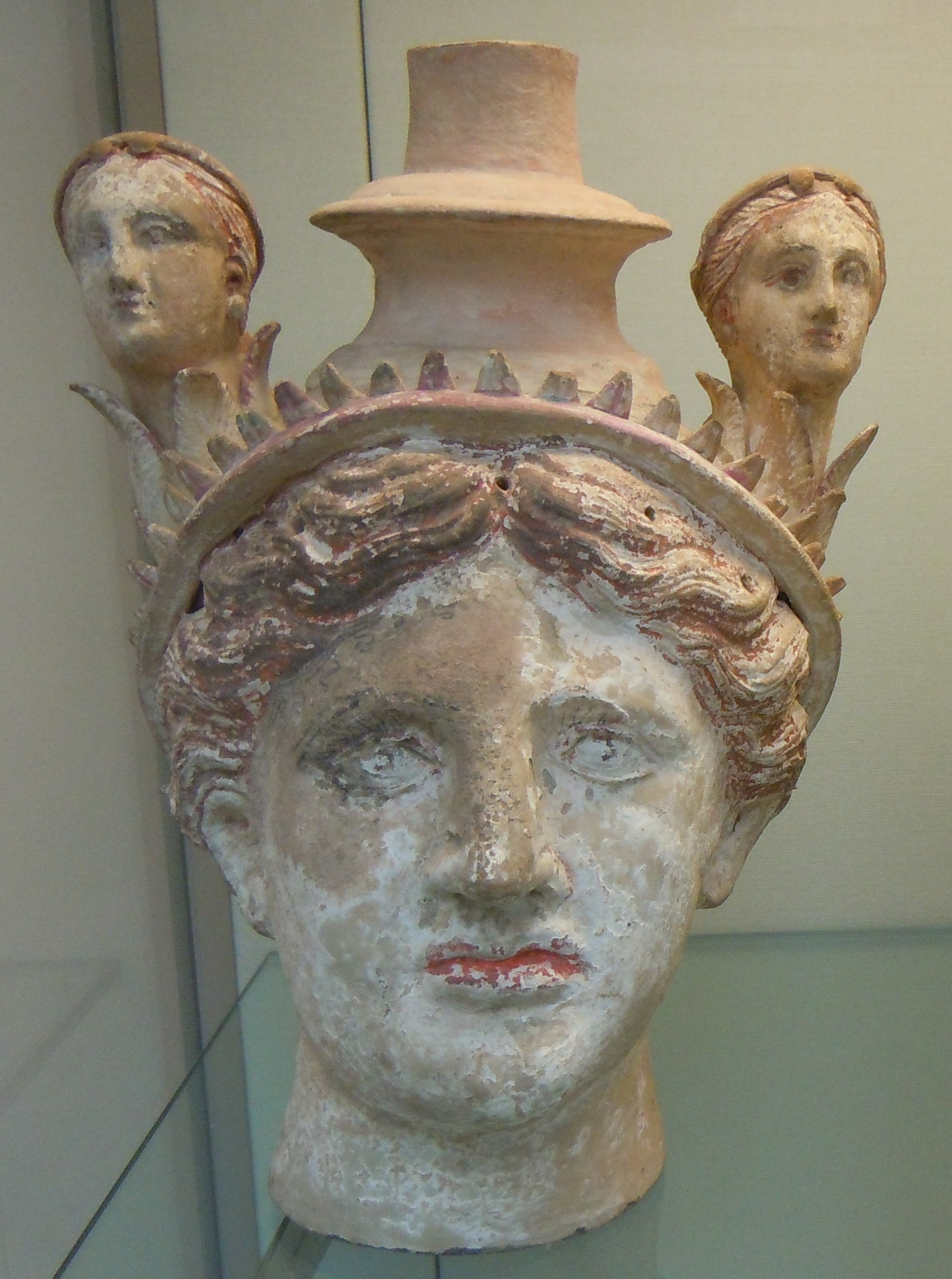
Female head incorporating a vase (lekythos), c. 325-300 BC.

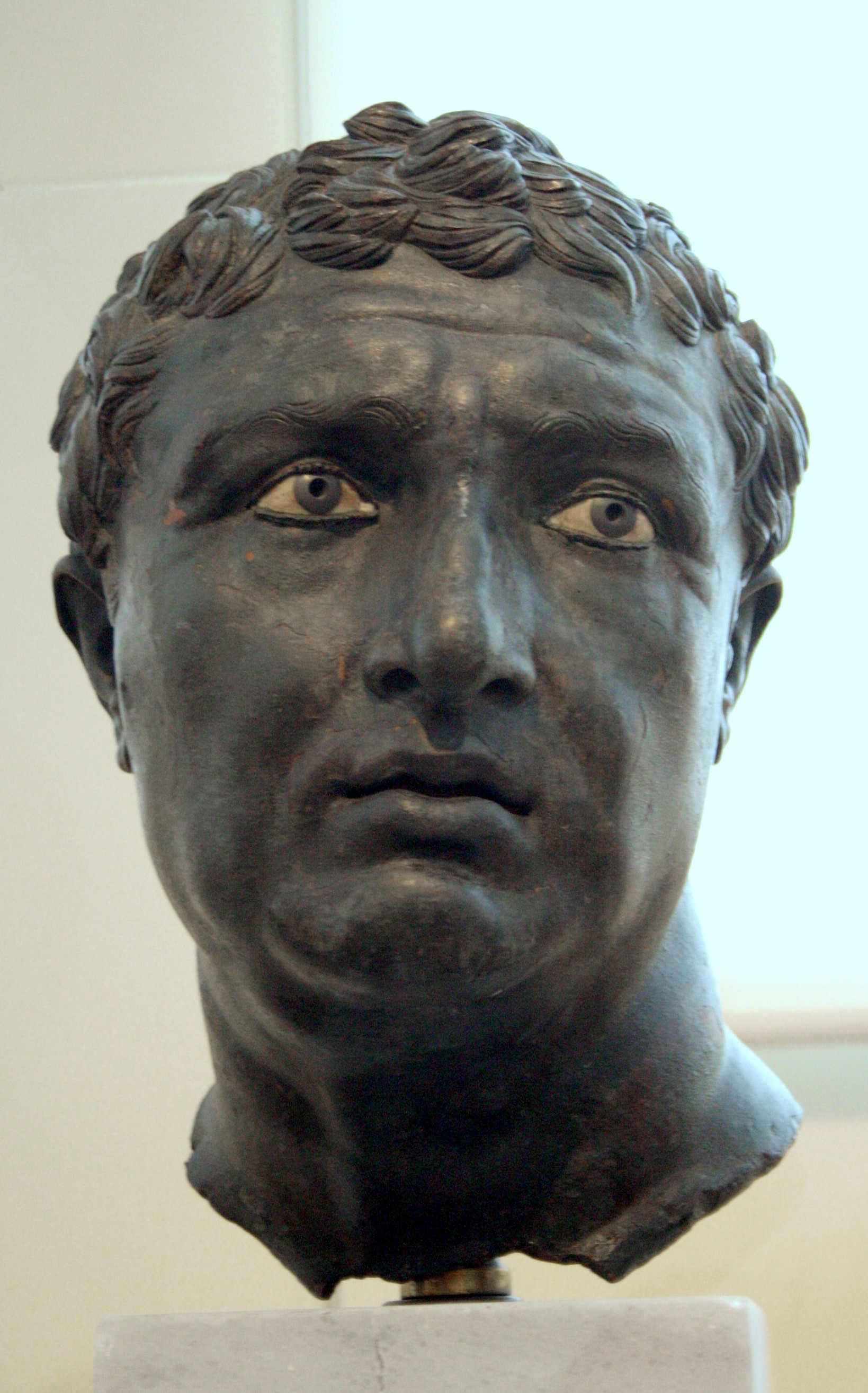
Bronze portrait of an unknown sitter, with inlaid eyes, Hellenistic period, 1st century BC, found in Lake Palestra of the Island of Delos.

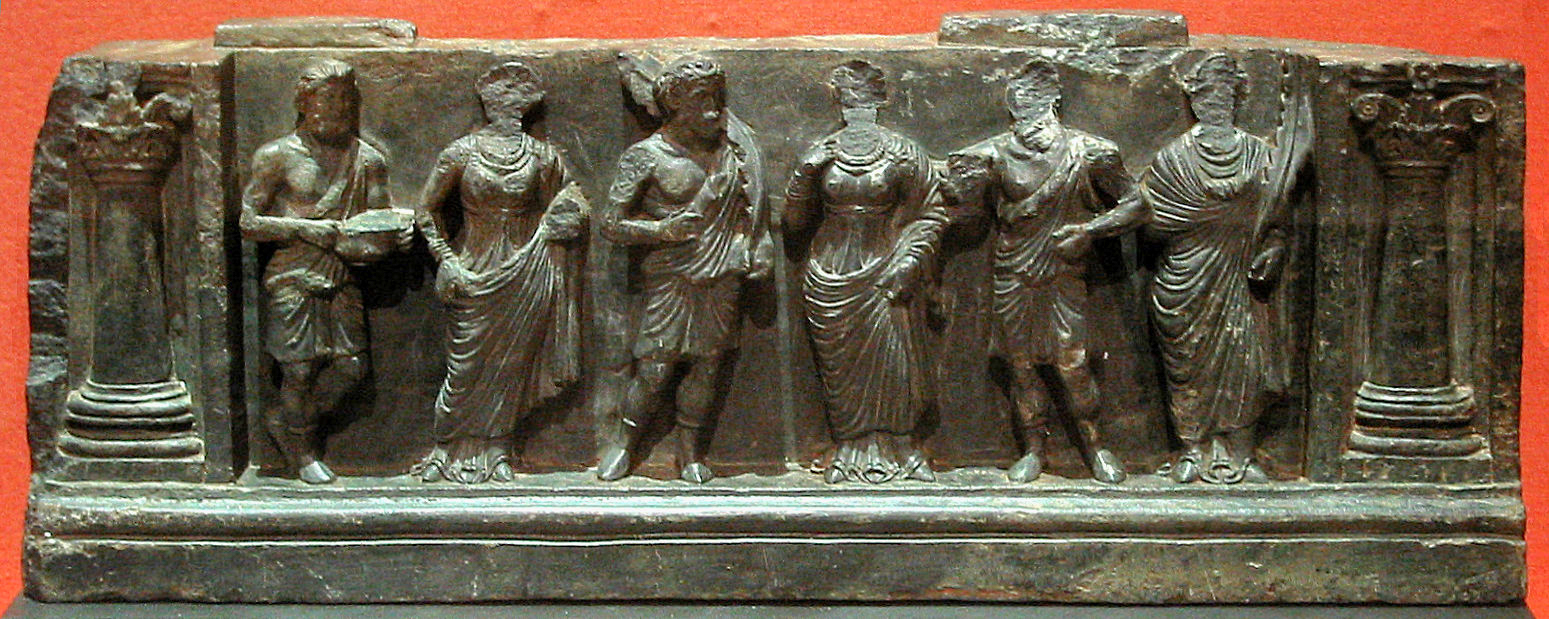
Greco-Buddhist frieze of Gandhara with devotees, holding plantain leaves, in Hellenistic style, inside Corinthian columns, 1st–2nd century CE. Buner, Swat, Pakistan. Victoria and Albert Museum.

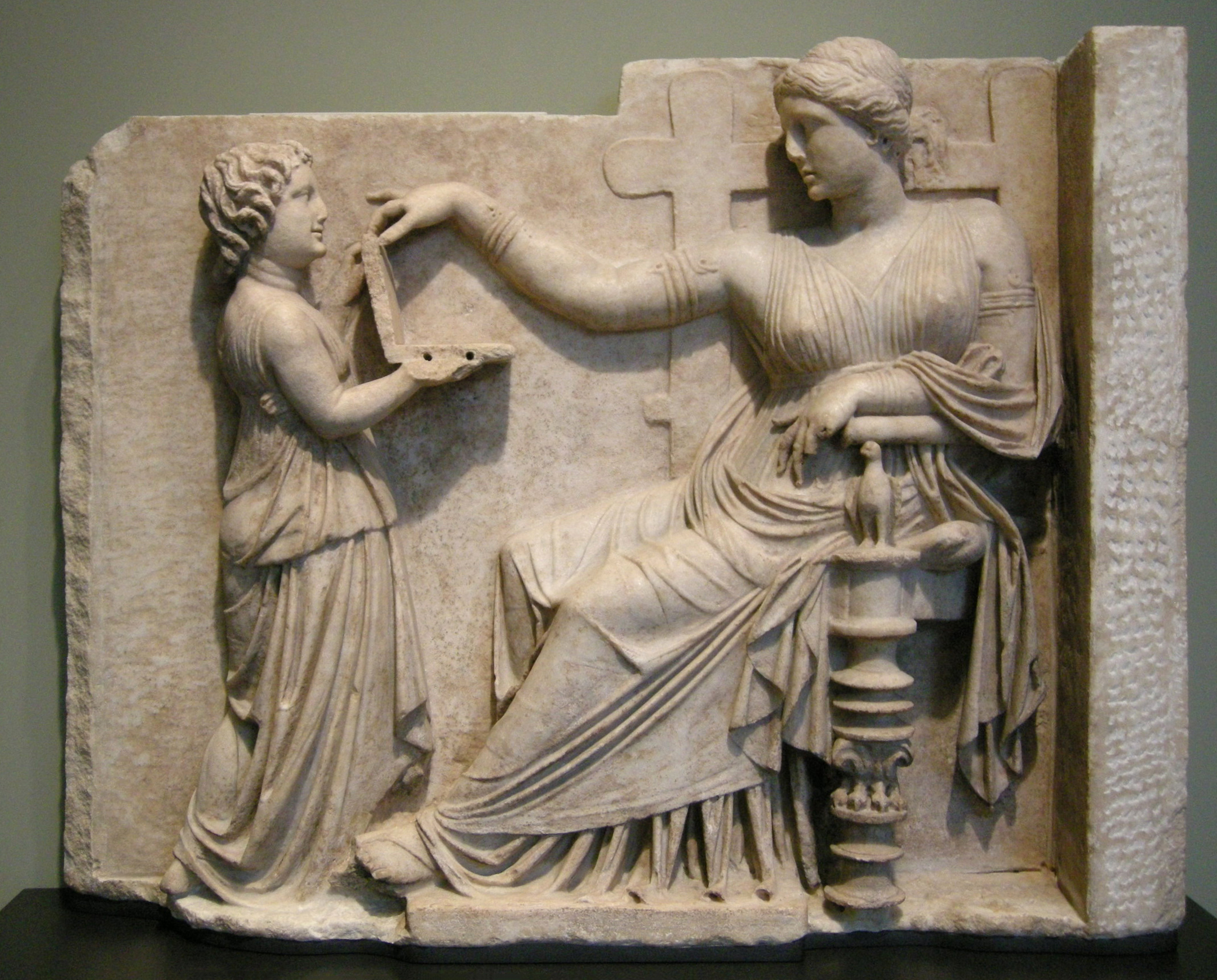
Gravestone of a woman with her child slave attending to her, c. 100 BC (early period of Roman Greece)

== Cult images ==
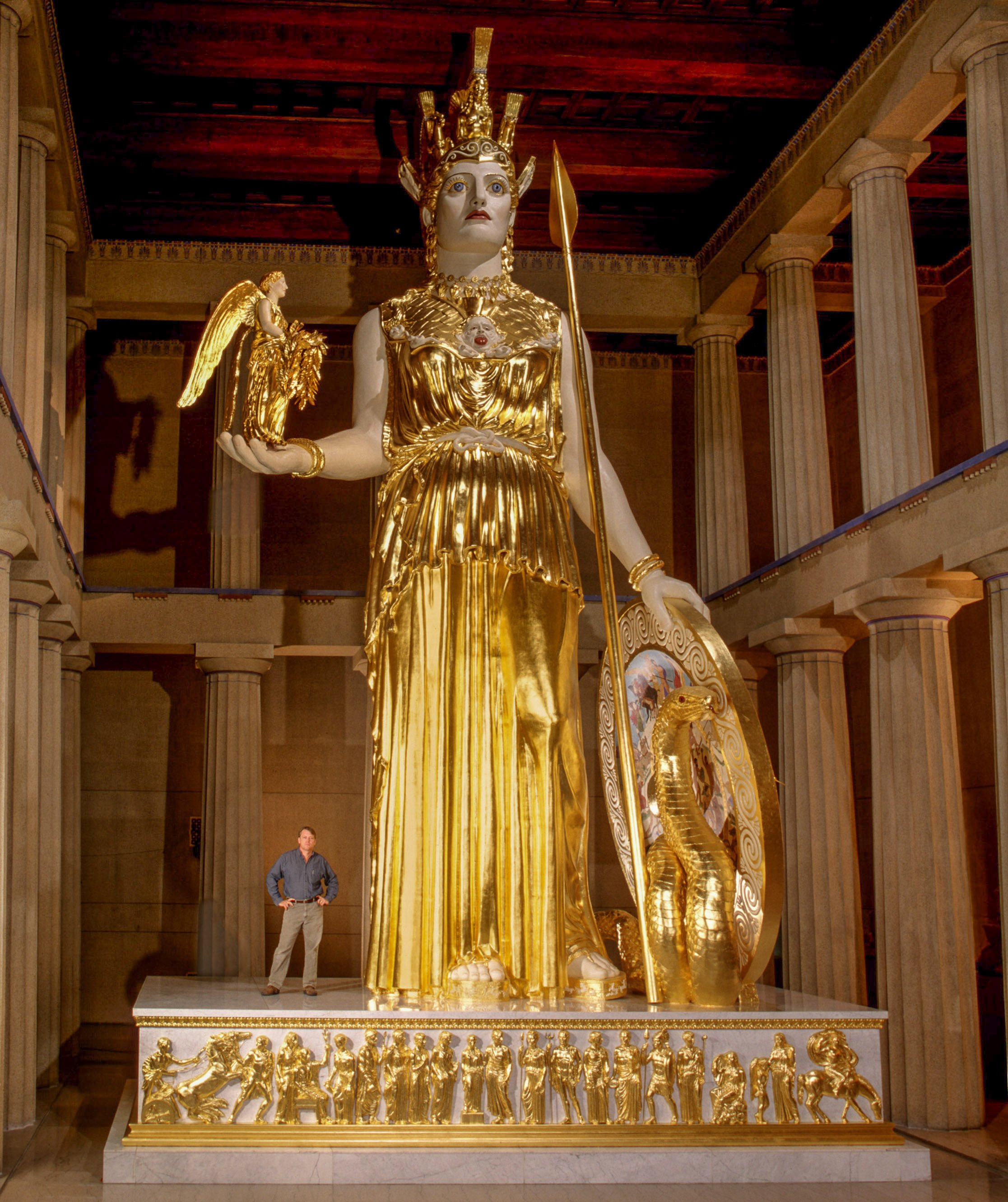
Reproduction of the Athena Parthenos statue at the original size in the Parthenon in Nashville, Tennessee.

All ancient Greek temples and Roman temples normally contained a cult image in the cella. Access to the cella varied, but apart from the priests, at the least some of the general worshippers could access the cella some of the time, though sacrifices to the deity were normally made on altars outside in the temple precinct (temenos in Greek). Some cult images were easy to see, and were what we would call major tourist attractions. The image normally took the form of a statue of the deity, originally less than life-size, then typically roughly life-size, but in some cases many times life-size, in marble or bronze, or in the specially prestigious form of a Chryselephantine statue using ivory plaques for the visible parts of the body and gold for the clothes, around a wooden framework. The most famous Greek cult images were of this type, including the Statue of Zeus at Olympia, and Phidias's Athena Parthenos in the Parthenon in Athens, both colossal statues now completely lost. Fragments of two chryselephantine statues from Delphi have been excavated. Cult images generally held or wore identifying attributes, which is one way of distinguishing them from the many other statues of deities in temples and other locations.

The acrolith was another composite form, this time a cost-saving one with a wooden body. A xoanon was a primitive and symbolic image, usually in wood, some perhaps comparable to the Hindu lingam, although the oldest cult image from the Greek world, the Minoan Palaikastro Kouros, is highly sophisticated. Many xoana were retained and revered for their antiquity in later periods; they were often light enough to be carried in processions. Many of the Greek statues well known from Roman marble copies were originally temple cult images, which in some cases, such as the Apollo Barberini, can be credibly identified. A very few actual originals survive, for example the bronze Piraeus Athena (2.35 metres high, including a helmet).

In Greek and Roman mythology, a "palladium" was an image of great antiquity on which the safety of a city was said to depend, especially the wooden one that Odysseus and Diomedes stole from the citadel of Troy and which was later taken to Rome by Aeneas. (The Roman story was related in Virgil's Aeneid and other works.)

== Drapery ==
=== Female ===
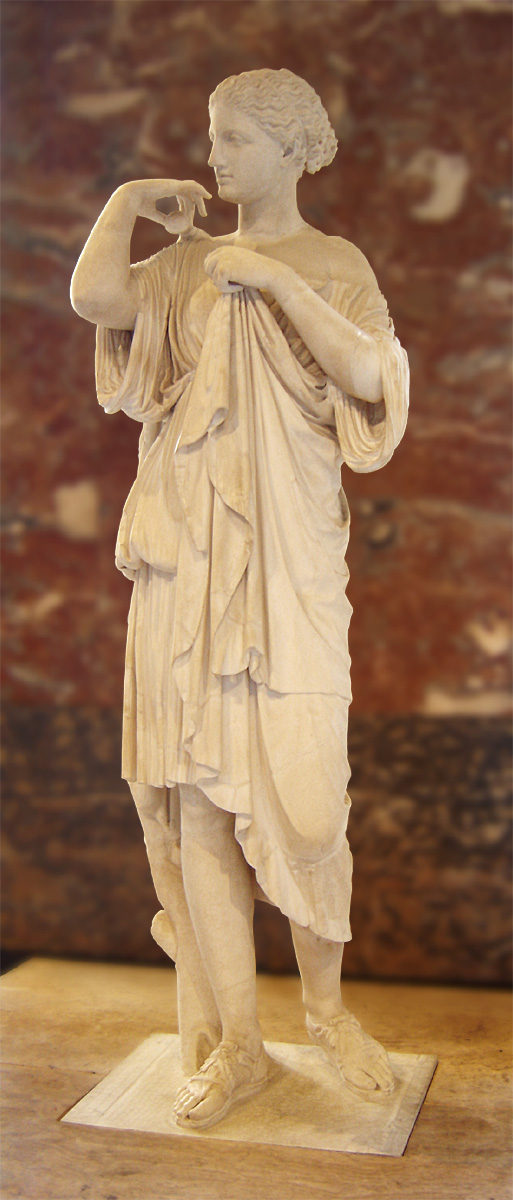
Diane of Gabies dressing with a diplax

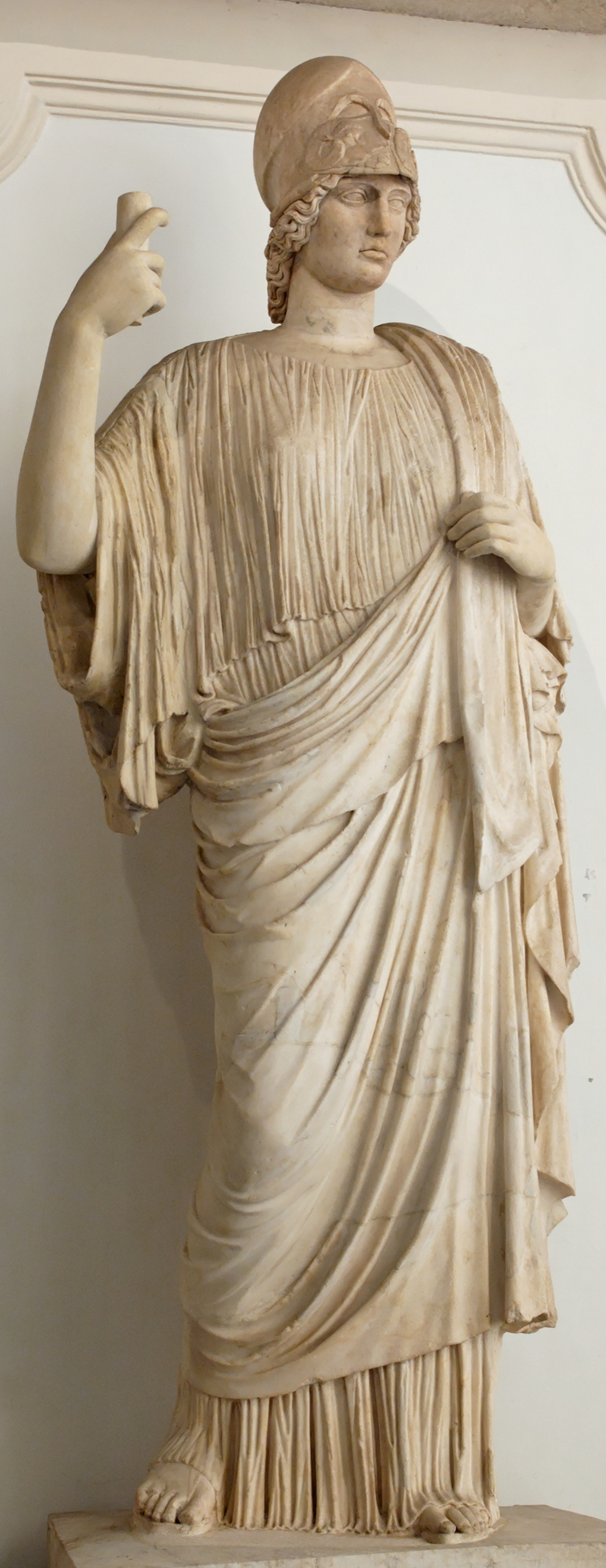
Pallas over a peplos.

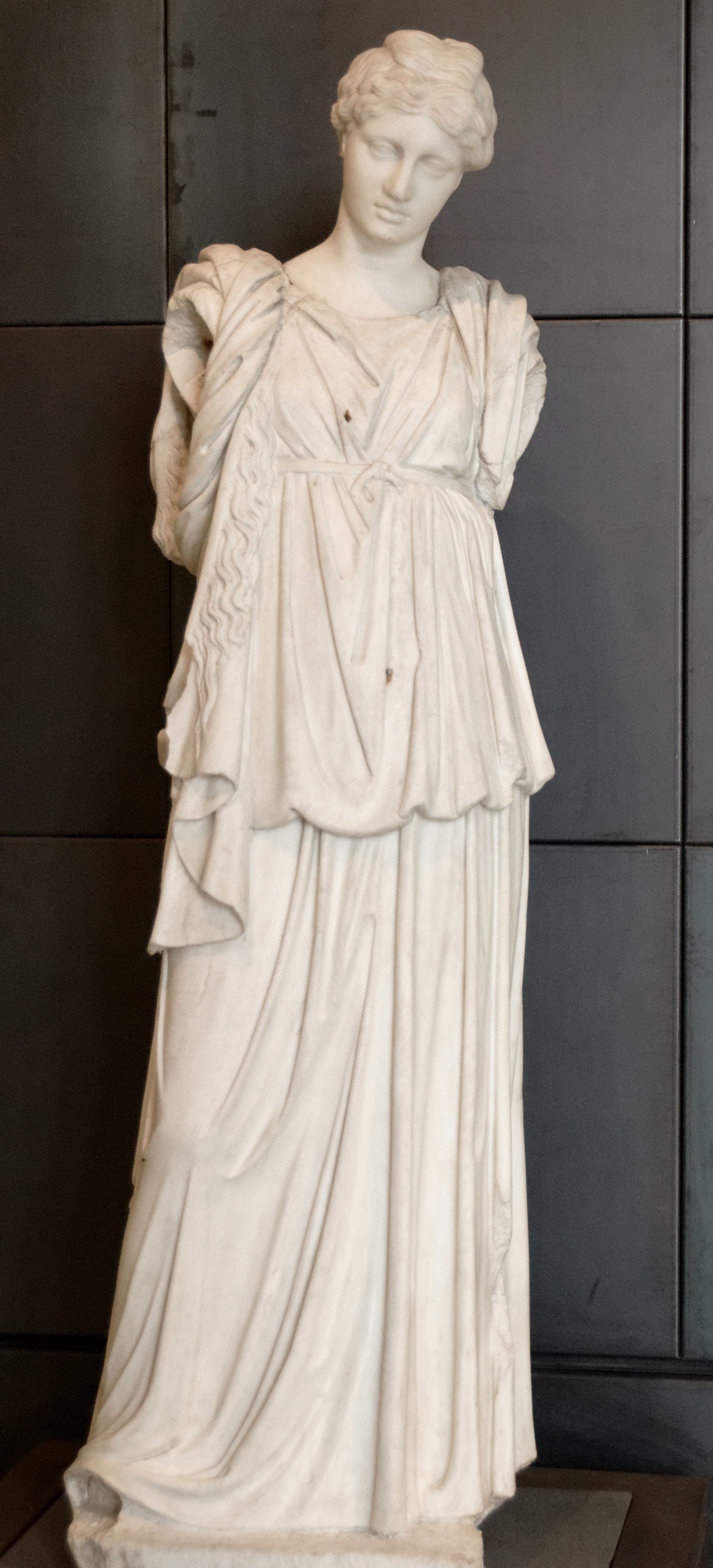
Chiton

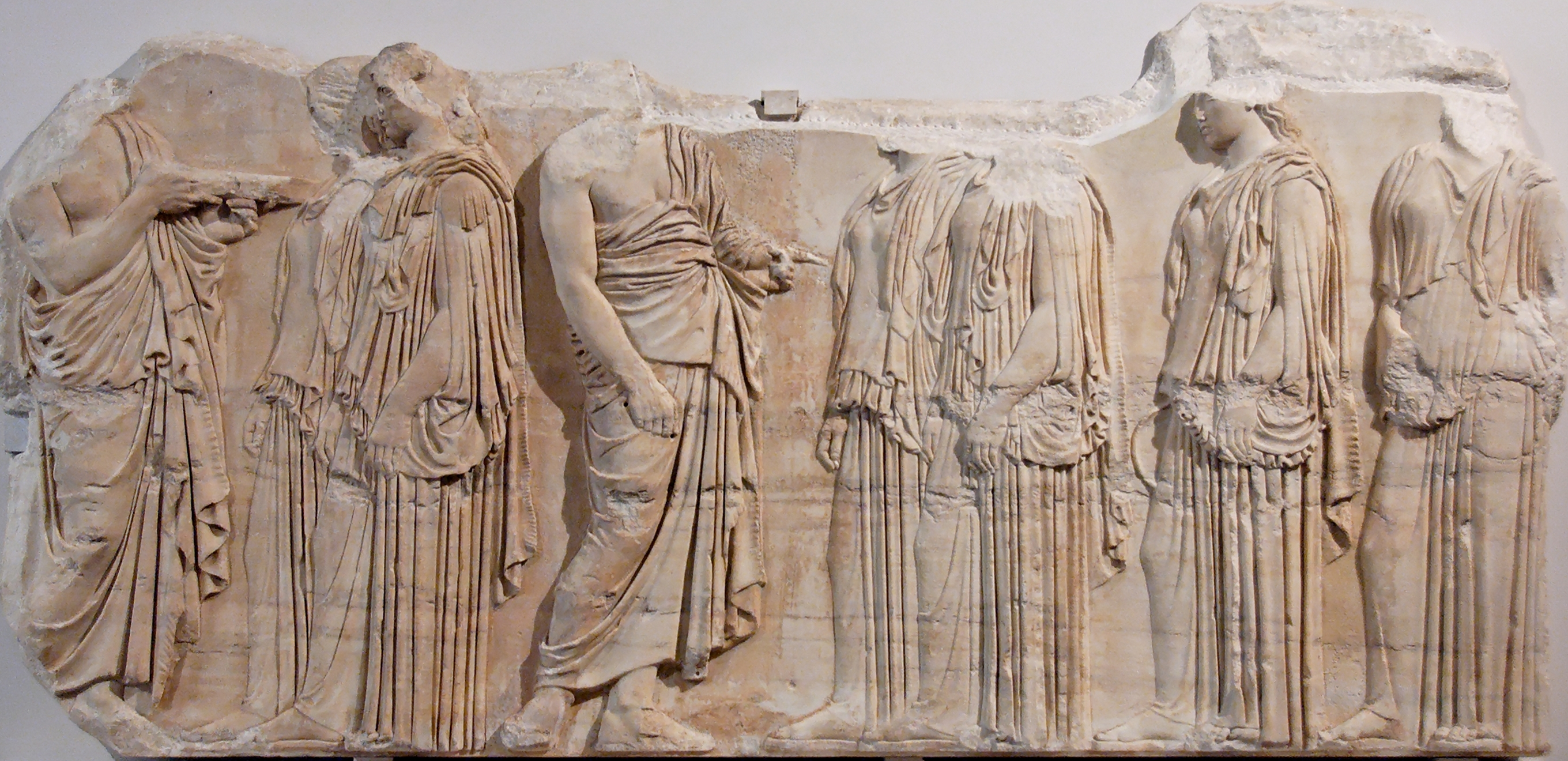
Weavers on the Parthenon Frieze

=== Male ===
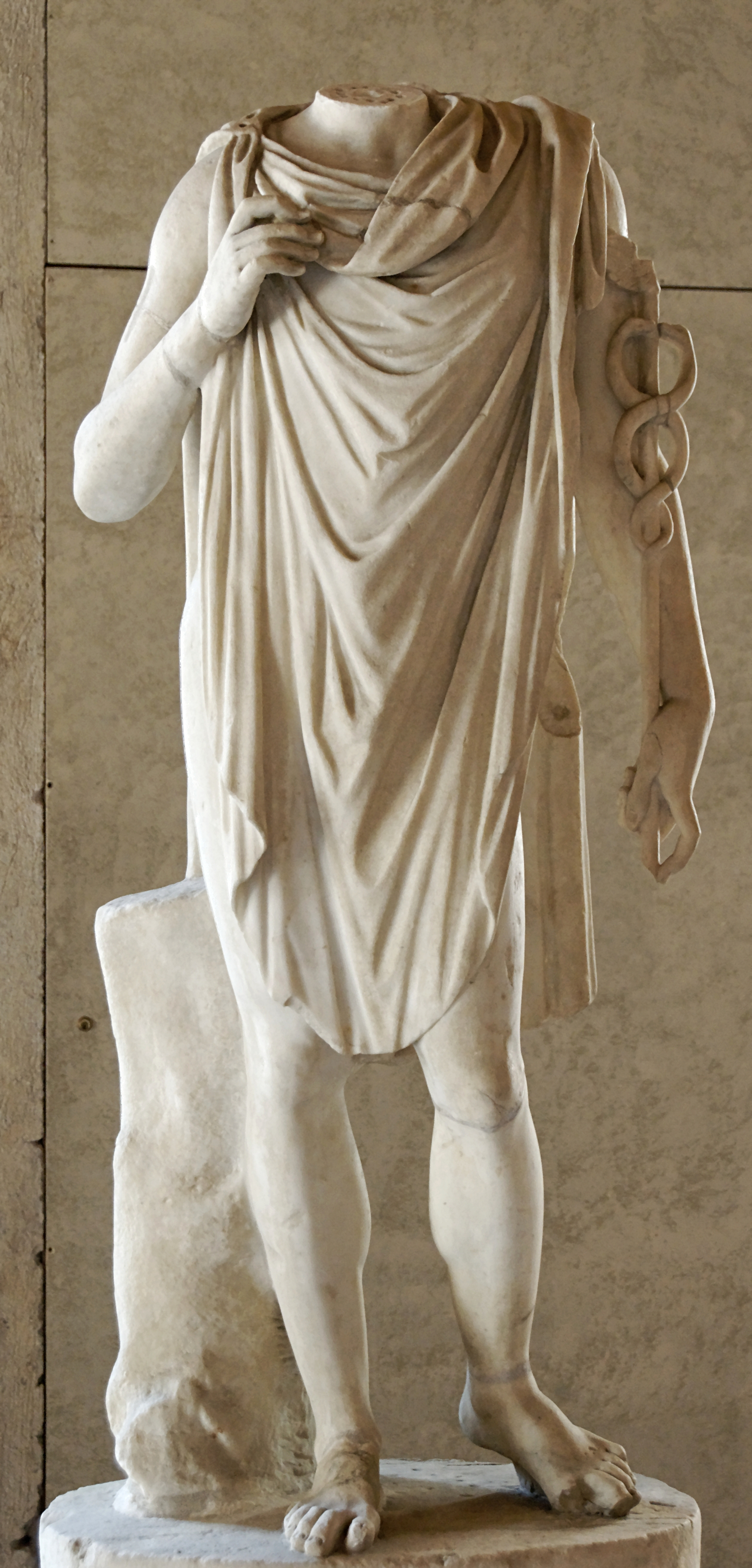
Chlamys

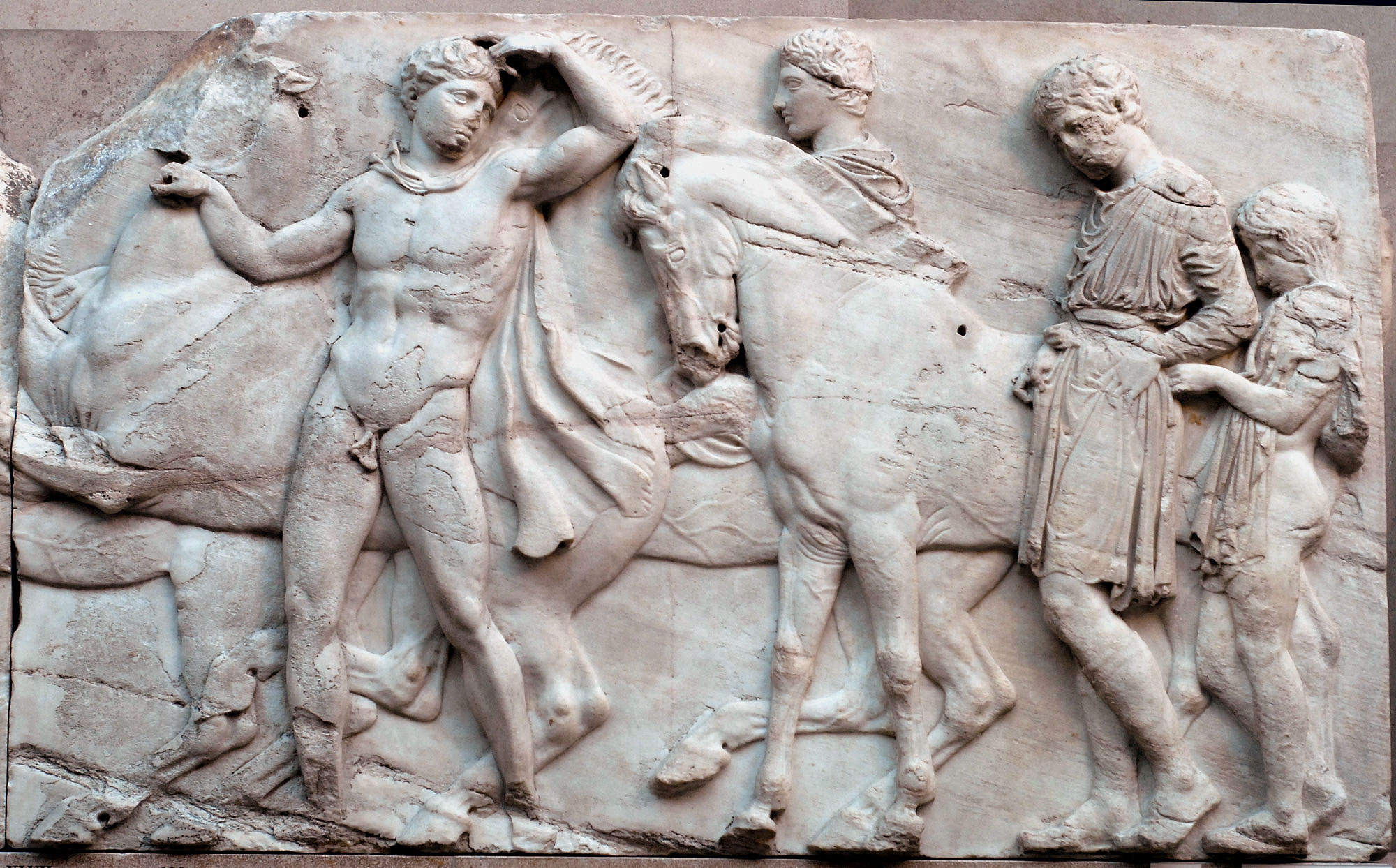
Parthenon Frieze

== See also ==
- Meniskos, a device for protecting statues placed outside

== Bibliography ==
- Boardman, John. Greek Sculpture: The Archaic Period: A Handbook. New York: Oxford University Press, 1978.
- --. Greek Sculpture: The Classical Period: A Handbook. London: Thames and Hudson, 1985.
- --. Greek Sculpture: The Late Classical Period and Sculpture In Colonies and Overseas. New York: Thames and Hudson, 1995.
- Dafas, K. A., 2019. Greek Large-Scale Bronze Statuary: The Late Archaic and Classical Periods, Institute of Classical Studies, School of Advanced Study, University of London, Bulletin of the Institute of Classical Studies, Monograph, BICS Supplement 138 (London).
- Dillon, Sheila. Ancient Greek Portrait Sculpture: Contexts, Subjects, and Styles. Cambridge: Cambridge University Press, 2006.
- Furtwängler, Adolf. Masterpieces of Greek Sculpture: A Series of Essays On the History of Art. London: W. Heinemann, 1895.
- Jenkins, Ian. Greek Architecture and Its Sculpture. Cambridge: Harvard University Press, 2006.
- Kousser, Rachel Meredith. The Afterlives of Greek Sculpture: Interaction, Transformation, and Destruction. New York: Cambridge University Press, 2017.
- Marvin, Miranda. The Language of the Muses: The Dialogue Between Roman and Greek Sculpture. Los Angeles: J. Paul Getty Museum, 2008.
- Mattusch, Carol C. Classical Bronzes: The Art and Craft of Greek and Roman Statuary. Ithaca: Cornell University Press, 1996.
- Muskett, G. M. Greek Sculpture. London: Bristol Classical Press, 2012.
- Neer, Richard. The Emergence of the Classical Style In Greek Sculpture. Chicago: University of Chicago Press, 2010.
- Neils, Jenifer. The Parthenon Frieze. Cambridge: Cambridge University Press, 2001.
- Palagia, Olga. Greek Sculpture: Function, Materials, and Techniques In the Archaic and Classical Periods. New York: Cambridge University Press, 2006.
- Palagia, Olga, and J. J. Pollitt. Personal Styles In Greek Sculpture. Cambridge: Cambridge University Press, 1996.
- Pollitt, J. J. The Ancient View of Greek Art: Criticism, History, and Terminology. New Haven: Yale University Press, 1974.
- --. Art In the Hellenistic Age. Cambridge: Cambridge University Press, 1986.
- Ridgway, Brunilde Sismondo. The Archaic Style In Greek Sculpture. 2nd ed. Chicago: Ares, 1993.
- --. Fourth-Century Styles In Greek Sculpture. Madison: University of Wisconsin Press, 1997.
- Smith, R. R. R. Hellenistic Royal Portraits. Oxford: Clarendon Press, 1988.
- --. Hellenistic Sculpture: A Handbook. New York: Thames and Hudson, 1991.
- Spivey, Nigel Jonathan. Understanding Greek Sculpture: Ancient Meanings, Modern Readings. New York: Thames and Hudson, 1996.
- --. Greek Sculpture. Cambridge: Cambridge University Press, 2013.
- Stanwick, Paul Edmund. Portraits of the Ptolemies: Greek Kings As Egyptian Pharaohs. Austin: University of Texas Press, 2002.
- Stewart, Andrew F. Greek Sculpture: An Exploration. New Haven: Yale University Press, 1990.
- --. Faces of Power: Alexander's Image and Hellenistic Politics. Berkeley: University of California Press, 1993.
- von Mach, Edmund. Greek Sculpture: Its Spirit and Its Principles. New York: Parkstone Press International, 2006.
- --. Greek Sculpture. New York: Parkstone International, 2012.
- Winckelmann, Johann Joachim, and Alex Potts. History of the Art of Antiquity. Los Angeles: Getty Research Institute, 2006.
