= Lost-wax casting =

Process by which a duplicate metal sculpture is cast from an original one

External videos
- Bronze casting (direct method). Khan Academy (video). Smarthistory.
- Adriaen de Vries's bronze casting techniques. J. Paul Getty Museum (video).

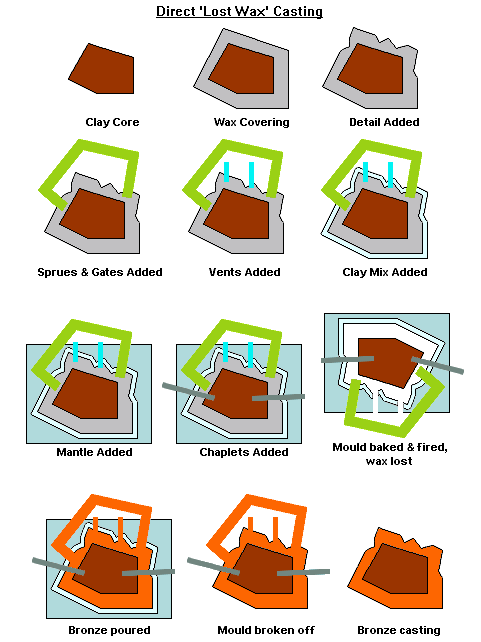
Illustration of stepwise bronze casting by the lost-wax method

Lost-wax casting – also called precision casting, lost-wax fusion, or cire perdue (French: [siʁ pɛʁdy]; borrowed from French) – is the process by which a duplicate sculpture (often a metal, such as silver, gold, brass, or bronze) is cast from an original sculpture. Intricate works can be achieved by this method. Investment casting is an industrial process based on lost-wax casting.

The oldest known examples of this technique are approximately 6,500 years old (4550–4450 BC) and attributed to gold artefacts found at Bulgaria's Varna Necropolis. A copper amulet from Mehrgarh, Indus Valley Civilization, in present-day Pakistan, is dated to circa 4000 BC. Cast copper objects, found in the Nahal Mishmar hoard in southern Israel, which belong to the Chalcolithic period (4500–3500 BC), are estimated, from carbon-14 dating, to date to circa 3500 BC. Other examples from somewhat later periods are from Mesopotamia in the third millennium BC. Lost-wax casting was widespread in Europe until the 18th century, when a piece-moulding process came to predominate.

The steps used in casting small bronze sculptures are fairly standardized, though the process today varies from foundry to foundry (in modern industrial use, the process is called investment casting). Variations of the process include: "lost mould", which recognizes that materials other than wax can be used (such as tallow, resin, tar, and textile).

== Process ==
On the left is an example of a rubber mould, often used in the lost-wax process, and on the right is the finished bronze sculpture.

A video illustrating the process used by the National Park Service to create bronze sculptures at the Saint-Gaudens National Historical Park in the United States

Casts can be made of the wax model itself, the direct method, or of a wax copy of a model that need not be of wax, the indirect method. These are the steps for the indirect process (the direct method starts at step 7):

1. Model-making. An artist or mould-maker creates an original model from wax, clay, or another material. Wax and oil-based clay are often preferred because these materials retain their softness.
2. Mouldmaking. A mould is made of the original model or sculpture. The rigid outer moulds contain the softer inner mould, which is the exact negative of the original model. Inner moulds are usually made of latex, polyurethane rubber or silicone, which is supported by the outer mould. The outer mould can be made from plaster, but can also be made of fiberglass or other materials. Most moulds are made of at least two pieces, and a shim with keys is placed between the parts during construction so that the mould can be put back together accurately. If there are long, thin pieces extending out of the model, they are often cut off of the original and moulded separately. Sometimes many moulds are needed to recreate the original model, especially for large models.
3. Wax. Once the mould is finished, molten wax is poured into it and swished around until an even coating, usually about 3 mm (1/8 inch) thick, covers the inner surface of the mould. This is repeated until the desired thickness is reached. Another method is to fill the entire mould with molten wax and let it cool until a desired thickness has set on the surface of the mould. After this the rest of the wax is poured out again, the mould is turned upside down and the wax layer is left to cool and harden. With this method it is more difficult to control the overall thickness of the wax layer.
4. Removal of wax. This hollow wax copy of the original model is removed from the mould. The model-maker may reuse the mould to make multiple copies, limited only by the durability of the mould.
5. Chasing. Each hollow wax copy is then "chased": a heated metal tool is used to rub out the marks that show the parting line or flashing where the pieces of the mould came together. The wax is dressed to hide any imperfections. The wax now looks like the finished piece. Wax pieces that were moulded separately can now be heated and attached; foundries often use registration marks to indicate exactly where they go.
6. Spruing. The wax copy is sprued with a treelike structure of wax that will eventually provide paths for the molten casting material to flow and for air to escape. The carefully planned spruing usually begins at the top with a wax "cup," which is attached by wax cylinders to various points on the wax copy. The spruing does not have to be hollow, as it will be melted out later in the process.
7. Slurry. A sprued wax copy is dipped into a slurry of silica, then into a sand-like stucco, or dry crystalline silica of a controlled grain size. The slurry and grit combination is called ceramic shell mould material, although it is not literally made of ceramic. This shell is allowed to dry, and the process is repeated until at least a half-inch coating covers the entire piece. The bigger the piece, the thicker the shell needs to be. Only the inside of the cup is not coated, and the cup's flat top serves as the base upon which the piece stands during this process. The core is also filled with fire-proof material.
8. Burnout. The ceramic shell-coated piece is placed cup-down in a kiln, whose heat hardens the silica coatings into a shell, and the wax melts and runs out. The melted wax can be recovered and reused, although it is often simply burned up. Now all that remains of the original artwork is the negative space formerly occupied by the wax, inside the hardened ceramic shell. The feeder, vent tubes and cup are also now hollow.
9. Testing. The ceramic shell is allowed to cool, then is tested to see if water will flow freely through the feeder and vent tubes. Cracks or leaks can be patched with thick refractory paste. To test the thickness, holes can be drilled into the shell, then patched.
10. Pouring. The shell is reheated in the kiln to harden the patches and remove all traces of moisture, then placed cup-upward into a tub filled with sand. Metal is melted in a crucible in a furnace, then poured carefully into the shell. The shell has to be hot because otherwise the temperature difference would shatter it. The filled shells are then allowed to cool.
11. Release. The shell is hammered or sand-blasted away, releasing the rough casting. The sprues, which are also faithfully recreated in metal, are cut off, the material to be reused in another casting.
12. Metal-chasing. Just as the wax copies were chased, the casting is worked until the telltale signs of the casting process are removed, so that the casting now looks like the original model. Pits left by air bubbles in the casting and the stubs of the spruing are filed down and polished.

Prior to silica-based casting moulds, these moulds were made of a variety of other fire-proof materials, the most common being plaster based, with added grout, and clay based. Prior to rubber moulds gelatine was used.

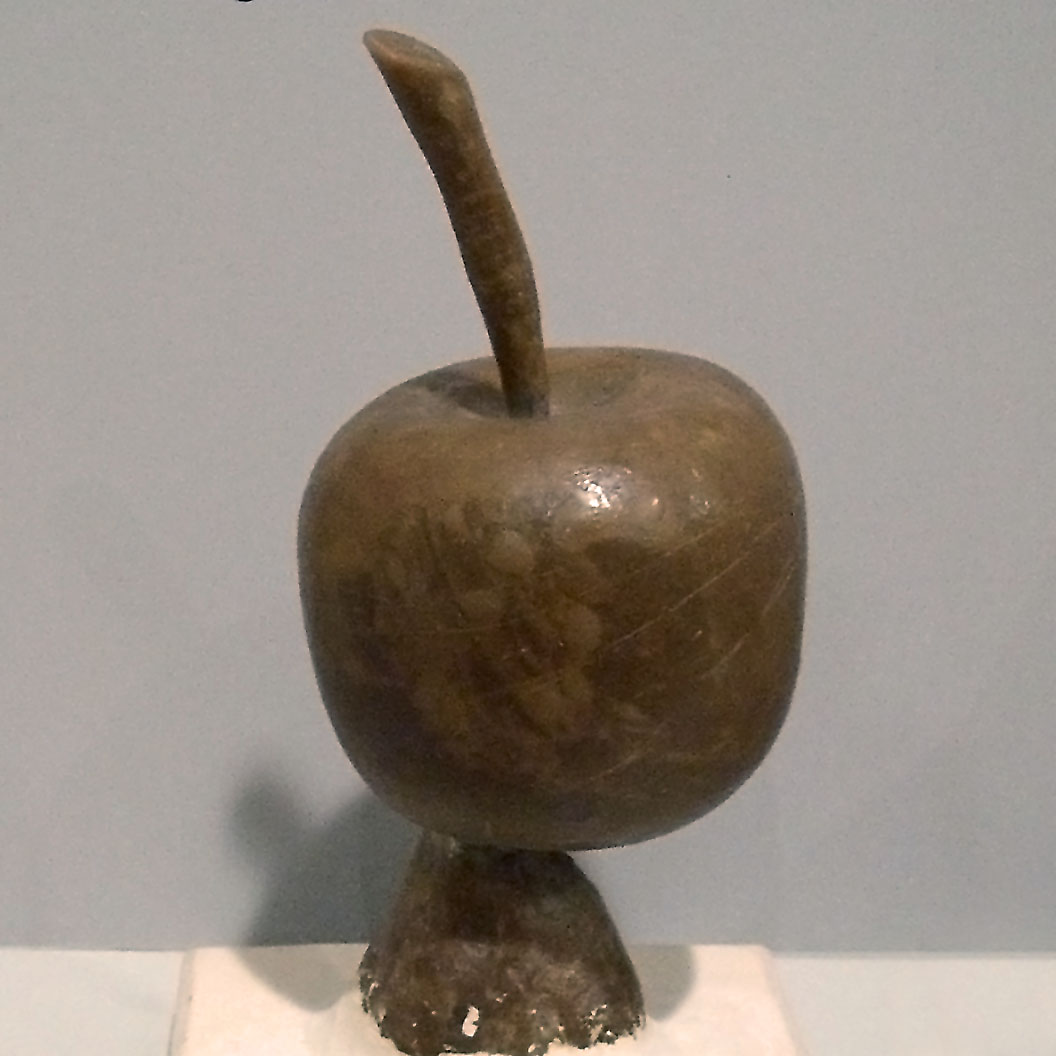
Step 1: A model of an apple in wax

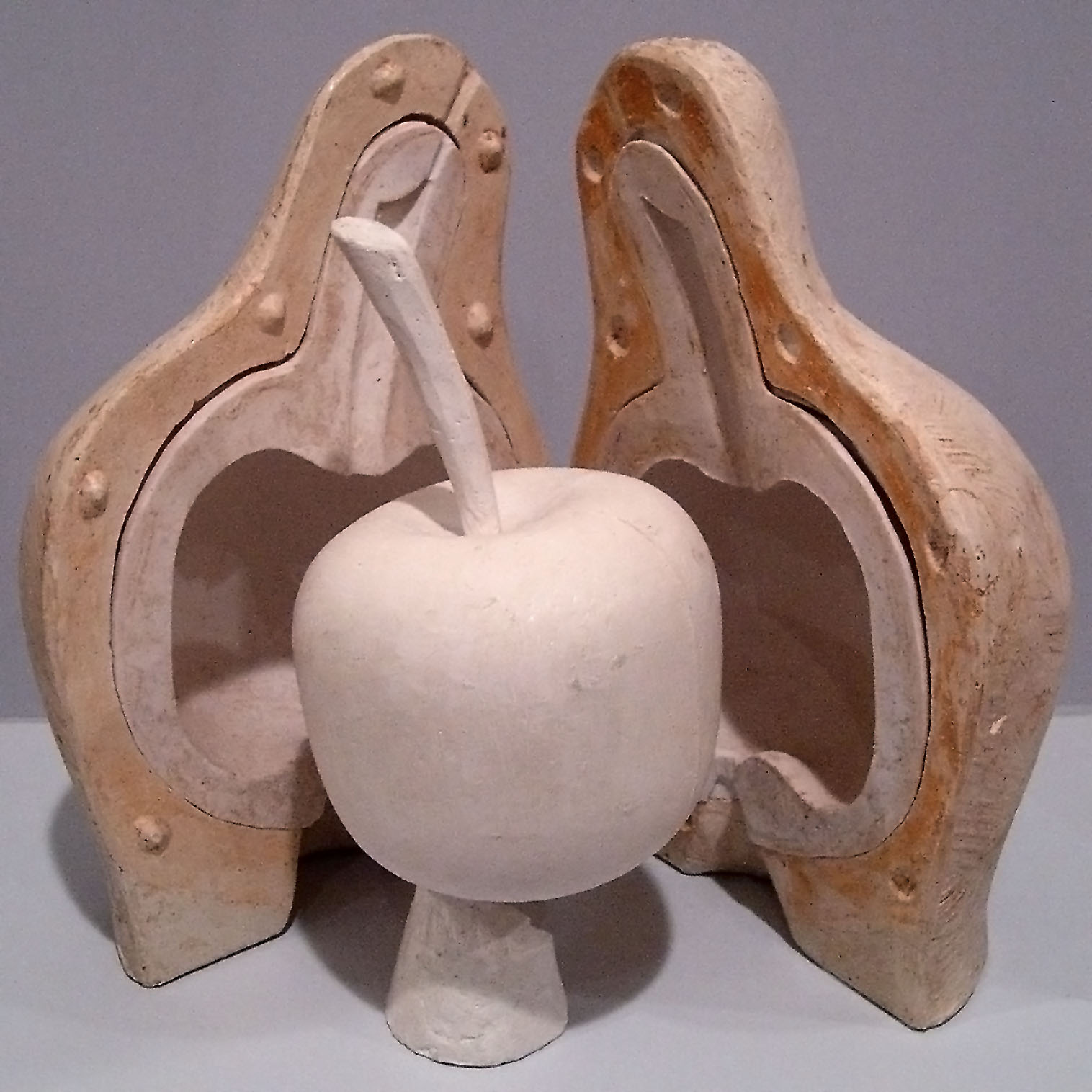
Step 2: From the model a rubber mould is made. (The mould is shown here with a solid cast in plaster.)

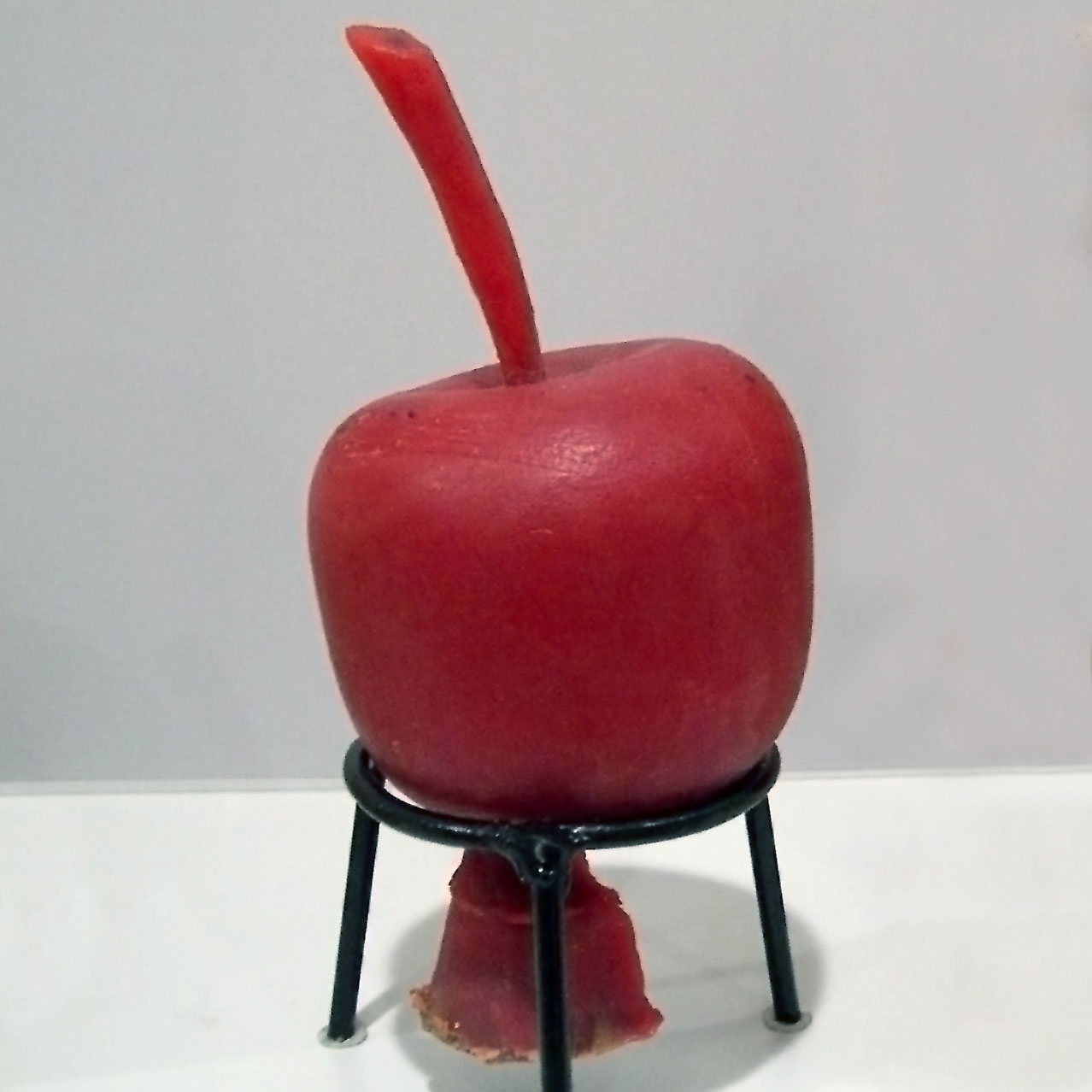
Step 3: From this rubber mould a hollow wax or paraffin cast is made.

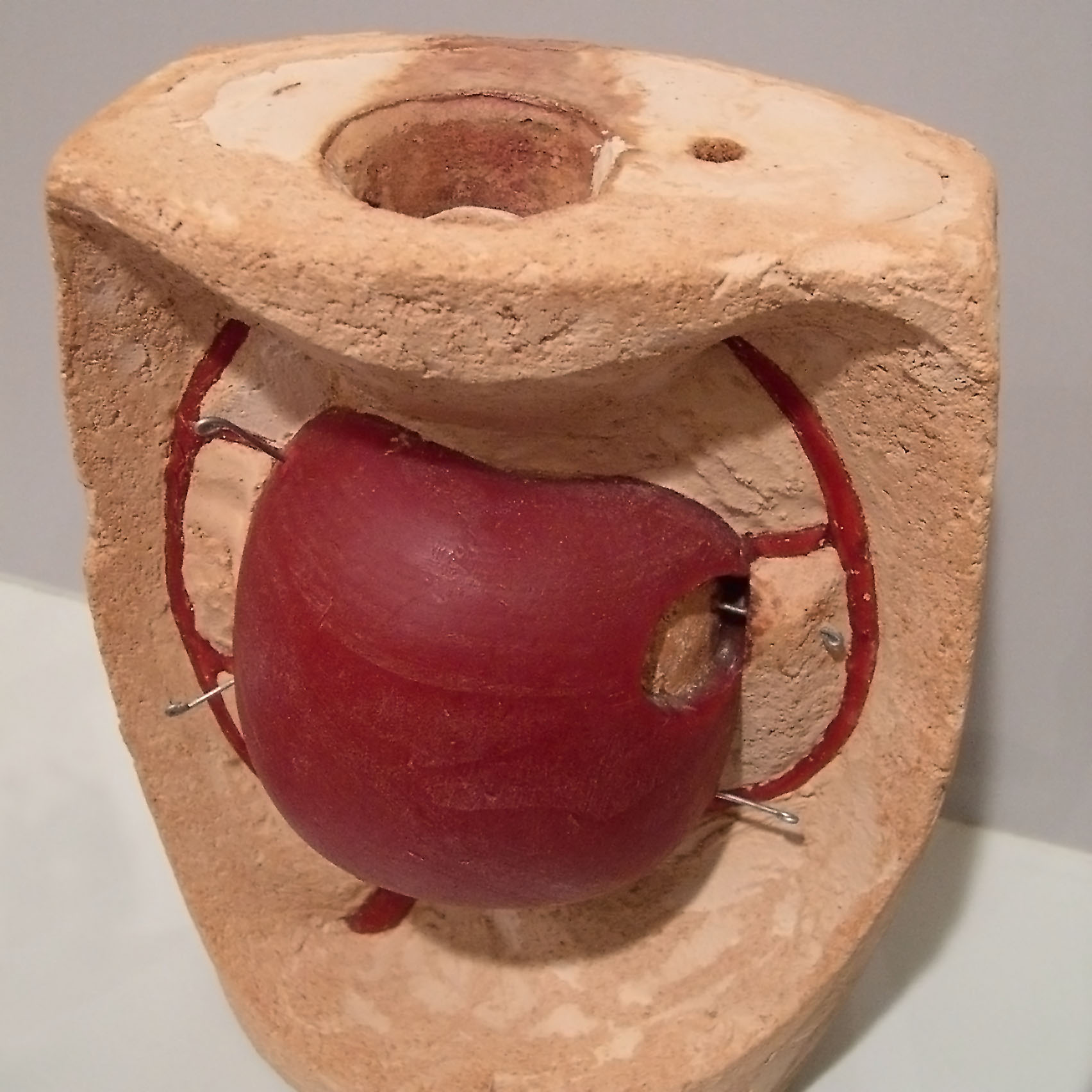
Step 4: The hollow paraffin apple is covered with a final, fire-proof mould, in this case clay-based, an open view. The core is also filled with fire-proof material. Note the stainless steel core supports. In the next step (not shown), the mould is heated in an oven upside-down and the wax is "lost".

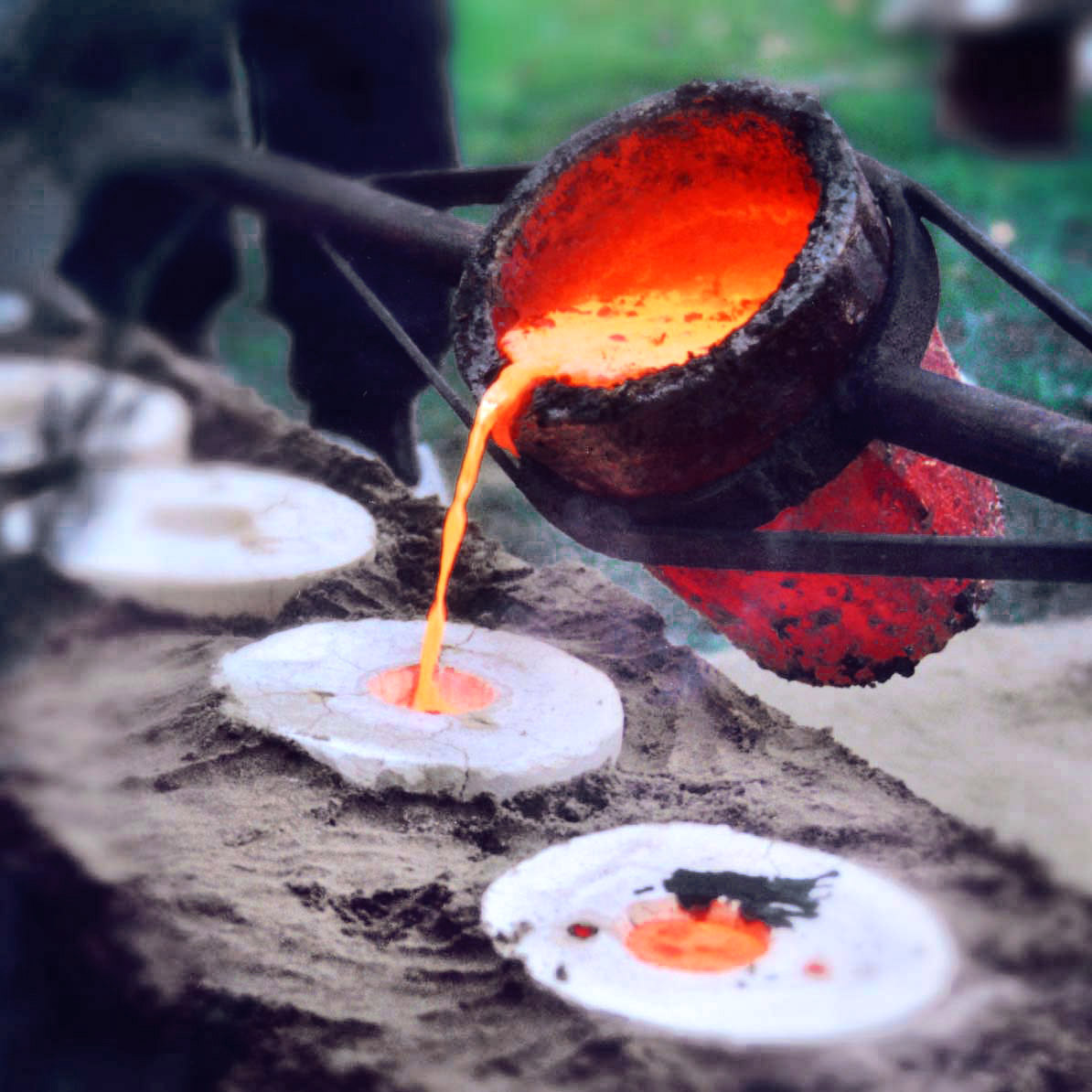
Step 5: Liquid bronze at 1200°C is poured into the dried and empty casting mould.

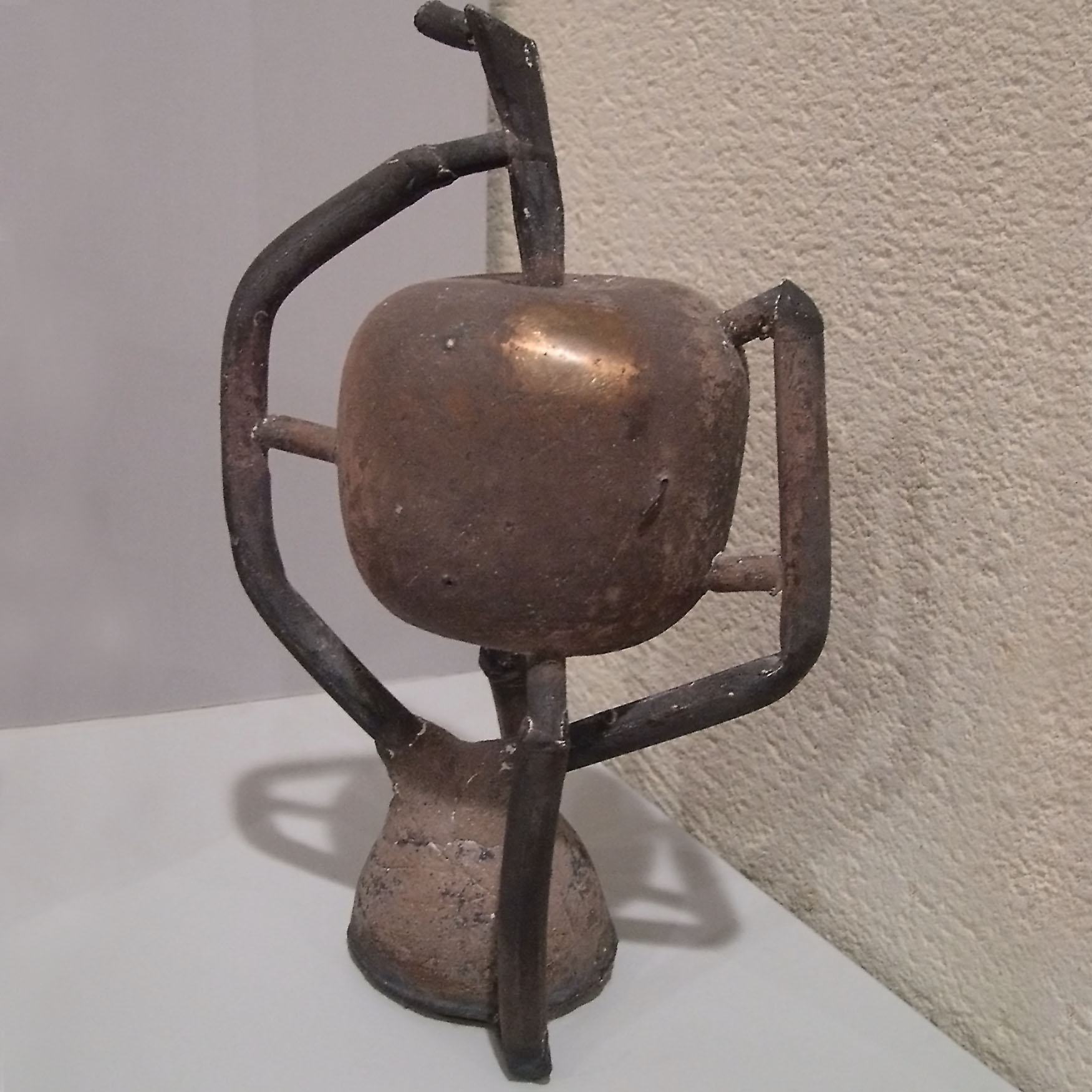
Step 6: The bronze cast, still with spruing attached. The sprue will be cut away and the final shape polished.

== Jewellery and small parts ==
The methods used for small parts and jewellery vary somewhat from those used for sculpture. A wax model is obtained either from injection into a rubber mould or by being custom-made by carving. The wax or waxes are sprued and fused onto a rubber base, called a "sprue base". Then a metal flask, which resembles a short length of steel pipe that ranges roughly from 3.5 to 15 centimeters (1.4 to 5.9 in) tall and wide, is put over the sprue base and the waxes. Most sprue bases have a circular rim which grips the standard-sized flask, holding it in place. Investment (refractory plaster) is mixed and poured into the flask, filling it. It hardens, then is burned out as outlined above. Casting is usually done straight from the kiln either by centrifugal casting or vacuum casting.

The lost-wax process can be used with any material that can burn, melt, or evaporate to leave a mould cavity. Some automobile manufacturers use a lost-foam technique to make engine blocks. The model is made of polystyrene foam, which is placed into a casting flask, consisting of a cope and drag, which is then filled with casting sand. The foam supports the sand, allowing shapes that would be impossible if the process had to rely on the sand alone. The metal is poured in, vaporizing the foam with its heat.

In dentistry, gold crowns, inlays and onlays are made by the lost-wax technique. Application of Lost Wax technique for the fabrication of cast inlay was first reported by Taggart. A typical gold alloy is about 60% gold and 28% silver with copper and other metals making up the rest. Careful attention to tooth preparation, impression taking and laboratory technique are required to make this type of restoration a success. Dental laboratories make other items this way as well.

== Textiles ==
In this process, the wax and the textile are both replaced by the metal during the casting process, whereby the fabric reinforcement allows for a thinner model, and thus reduces the amount of metal expended in the mould. Evidence of this process is seen by the textile relief on the reverse side of objects and is sometimes referred to as "lost-wax, lost textile". This textile relief is visible on gold ornaments from burial mounds in southern Siberia of the ancient horse riding tribes, such as the distinctive group of openwork gold plaques housed in the Hermitage Museum, Saint Petersburg. The technique may have its origins in the Far East, as indicated by the few Han examples, and the bronze buckle and gold plaques found at the cemetery at Xigou. Such a technique may also have been used to manufacture some Viking Age oval brooches, indicated by numerous examples with fabric imprints such as those of Castletown (Scotland).

== Glass sculptures ==
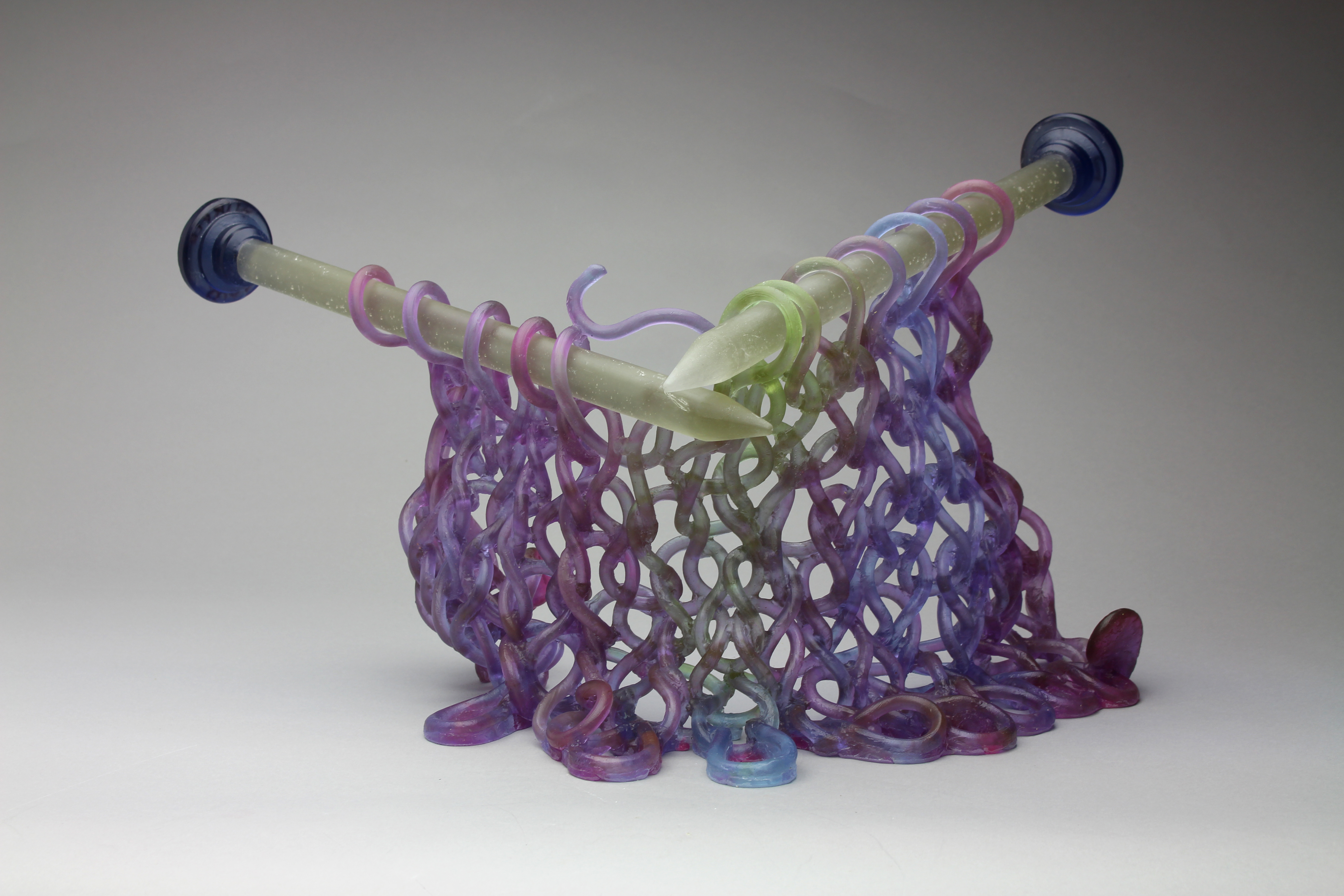
Lost-wax cast glass sculpture "Purple Reigns" by Carol Milne

The lost-wax casting process may also be used in the production of cast glass sculptures. The original sculpture is made from wax. The sculpture is then covered with mold material (e.g., plaster), except for the bottom of the mold which must remain open. When the mold has hardened, the encased sculpture is removed by applying heat to the bottom of the mold. This melts out the wax (the wax is 'lost') and destroys the original sculpture. The mold is then placed in a kiln upside down with a funnel-like cup on top that holds small chunks of glass. When the kiln is brought up to temperature (1,450–1,530 °F or 790–830 °C), the glass chunks melt and flow down into the mold. Annealing time is usually 3–5 days, and total kiln time is 5 or more days. After the mold is removed from the kiln, the mold material is removed to reveal the sculpture inside.

== Archaeological history ==
=== Black Sea ===
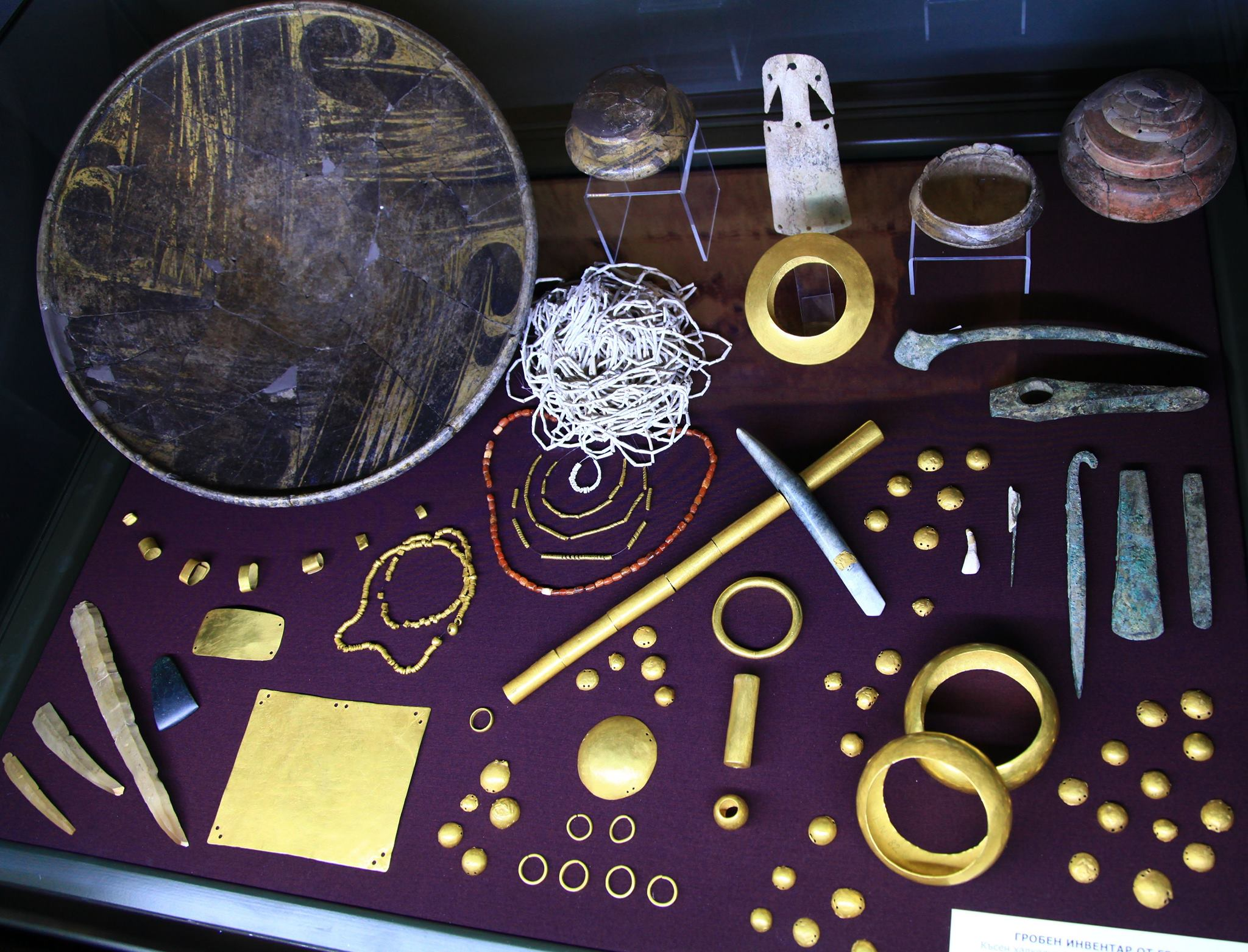
Varna necropolis, grave offerings on exhibit at the Varna Museum

Cast gold knucklebones, beads, and bracelets, found in graves at Bulgaria's Varna Necropolis, have been dated to approximately 6500 years BP. They are believed to be both some of the oldest known manufactured golden objects, and the oldest objects known to have been made using lost wax casting.

=== Middle East ===
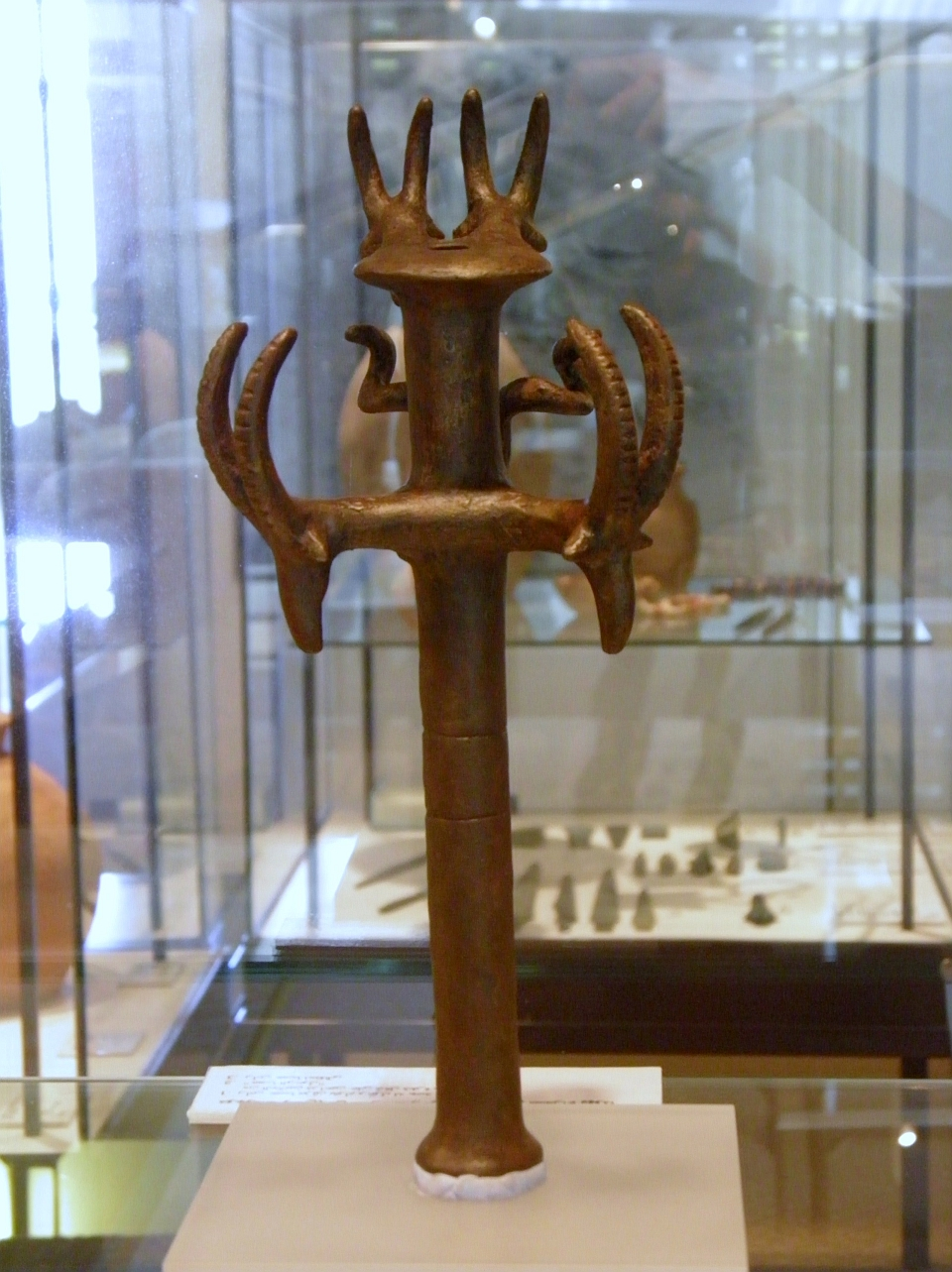
Replica of a bronze sceptre from the Nahal Mishmar hoard

Some of the oldest known examples of the lost-wax technique are the objects discovered in the Nahal Mishmar hoard in southern Land of Israel, and which belong to the Chalcolithic period (4500–3500 BC). Conservative carbon-14 estimates date the items to around 3700 BC, making them more than 5,700 years old.

=== Near East ===
In Mesopotamia, from c. 3500–2750 BC, the lost-wax technique was used for small-scale, and then later large-scale copper and bronze statues. One of the earliest surviving lost-wax castings is a small lion pendant from Uruk IV. Sumerian metalworkers were practicing lost-wax casting from approximately c. 3500–3200 BC. Much later examples from northeastern Mesopotamia/Anatolia include the Great Tumulus at Gordion (late 8th century BC), as well as other types of Urartian cauldron attachments.

=== South Asia ===
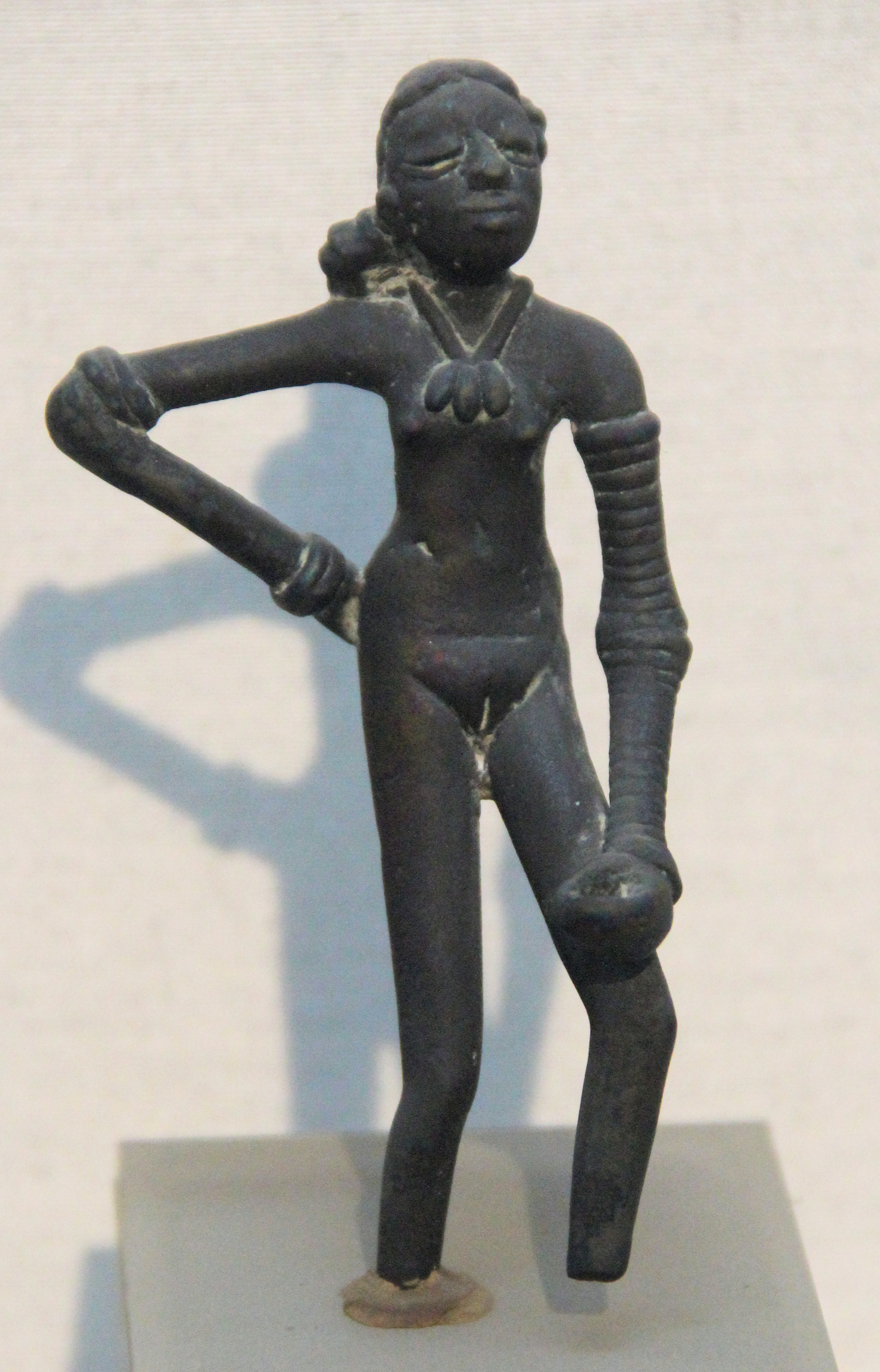
The Dancing Girl of Mohenjo-daro; 2300–1750 BC

Metal casting, by the Indus Valley Civilization, produced some of the earliest known examples of lost-wax casting applied to the casting of copper alloys. A copper, wheel-shaped amulet found at Mehrgarh, Pakistan has been dated at ca. 4000 BCE. A bronze figurine, found at Mohenjo-daro, and named the "dancing girl", is dated to 2300–1750 BC. Other examples include the buffalo, bull and dog found at Mohenjodaro and Harappa, two copper figures found at the Harappan site Lothal in the district of Ahmedabad of Gujarat, and likely a covered cart with wheels missing and a complete cart with a driver found at Chanhudaro.

During the post-Harappan period, hoards of copper and bronze implements made by the lost-wax process are known from Tamil Nadu, Uttar Pradesh, Bihar, Madhya Pradesh, Odisha, Andhra Pradesh and West Bengal. Gold and copper ornaments, apparently Hellenistic in style, made by cire perdue were found at the ruins at Sirkap. One example of this Indo-Greek art dates to the 1st century BC the juvenile figure of Harpocrates excavated at Taxila. Bronze icons were produced during the 3rd and 4th centuries, such as the Buddha image at Amaravati, and the images of Rama and Kartikeya in the Guntur district of Andhra Pradesh. A further two bronze images of Parsvanatha and a small hollow-cast bull came from Sahribahlol, Gandhara, and a standing Tirthankara (2nd~3rd century AD) from Chausa in Bihar should be mentioned here as well. Other notable bronze figures and images have been found in Rupar, Mathura (in Uttar Pradesh) and Brahmapura, Maharashtra.

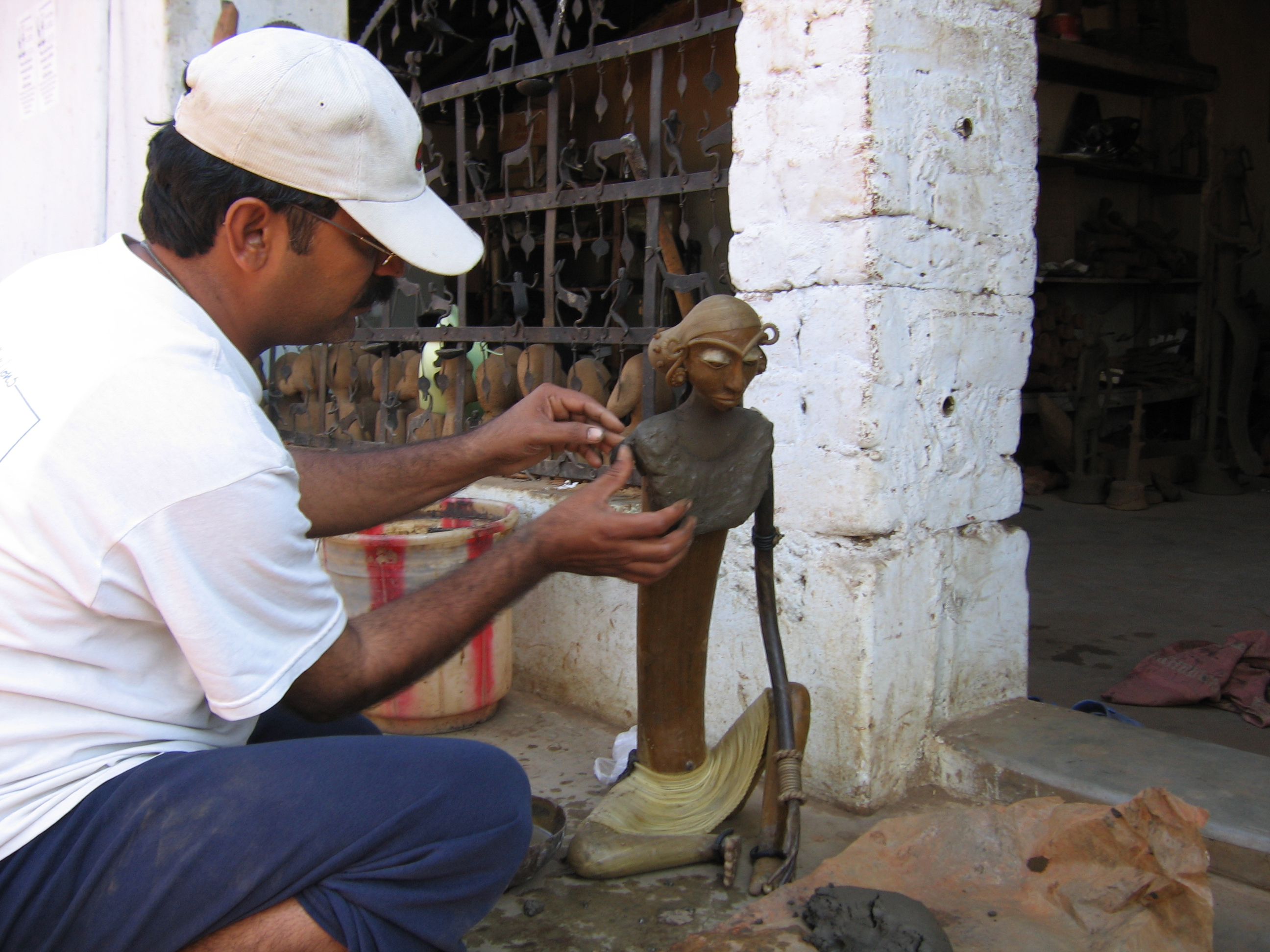
Making sculpture using a lost wax process at Bastar district, Chhattisgarh, India

Gupta and post-Gupta period bronze figures have been recovered from the following sites: Saranath, Mirpur-Khas (in Pakistan), Sirpur (District of Raipur), Balaighat (near Mahasthan now in Bangladesh), Akota (near Vadodara, Gujarat), Vasantagadh, Chhatarhi, Barmer and Chambi (in Rajesthan). The bronze casting technique and making of bronze images of traditional icons reached a high stage of development in South India during the medieval period. Although bronze images were modelled and cast during the Pallava Period in the eighth and ninth centuries, some of the most beautiful and exquisite statues were produced during the Chola Period in Tamil Nadu from the tenth to the twelfth century. The technique and art of fashioning bronze images is still skillfully practised in South India, particularly in Kumbakonam. The distinguished patron during the tenth century was the widowed Chola queen, Sembiyan Maha Devi. Chola bronzes are the most sought-after collector's items by art lovers all over the world. The technique was used throughout India, as well as in the neighbouring countries Nepal, Tibet, Ceylon, Burma and Siam.

=== Southeast Asia ===
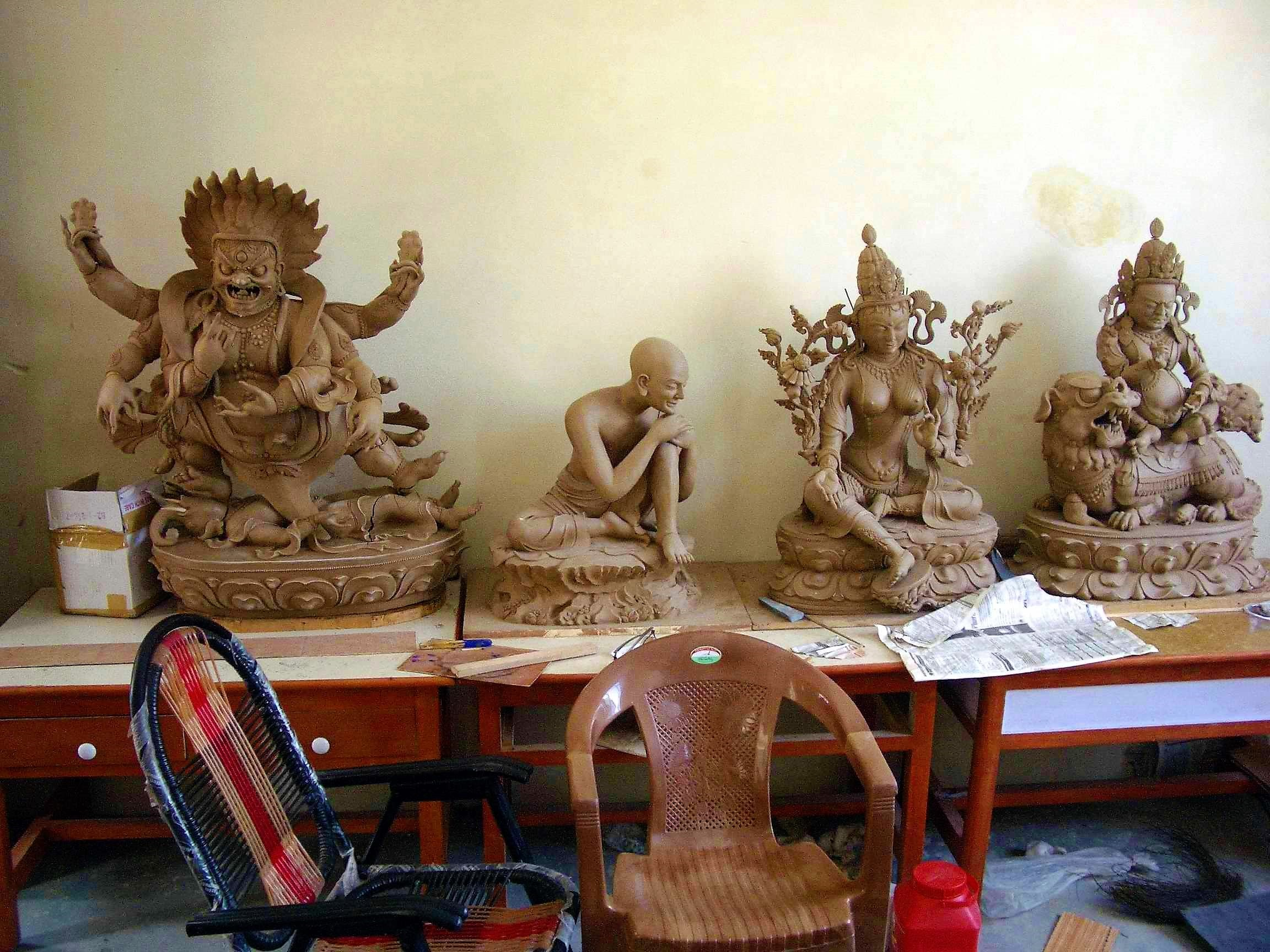
Wax forms for casting bronze statues for a Tibetan monastery near Kullu, Himachal Pradesh, India

The inhabitants of Ban Na Di were casting bronze from c. 1200 BC to 200 AD, using the lost-wax technique to manufacture bangles. Bangles made by the lost-wax process are characteristic of northeast Thailand. Some of the bangles from Ban Na Di revealed a dark grey substance between the central clay core and the metal, which on analysis was identified as an unrefined form of insect wax. It is likely that decorative items, like bracelets and rings, were made by cire perdue at Non Nok Tha and Ban Chiang. There are technological and material parallels between northeast Thailand and Vietnam concerning the lost-wax technique. The sites exhibiting artifacts made by the lost-mould process in Vietnam, such as the Dong Son drums, come from the Dong Son, and Phung Nguyen cultures, such as one sickle and the figure of a seated individual from Go Mun (near Phung Nguyen, the Bac Bo Region), dating to the Go Mun phase (end of the General B period, up until the 7th century BC).

=== West Africa ===
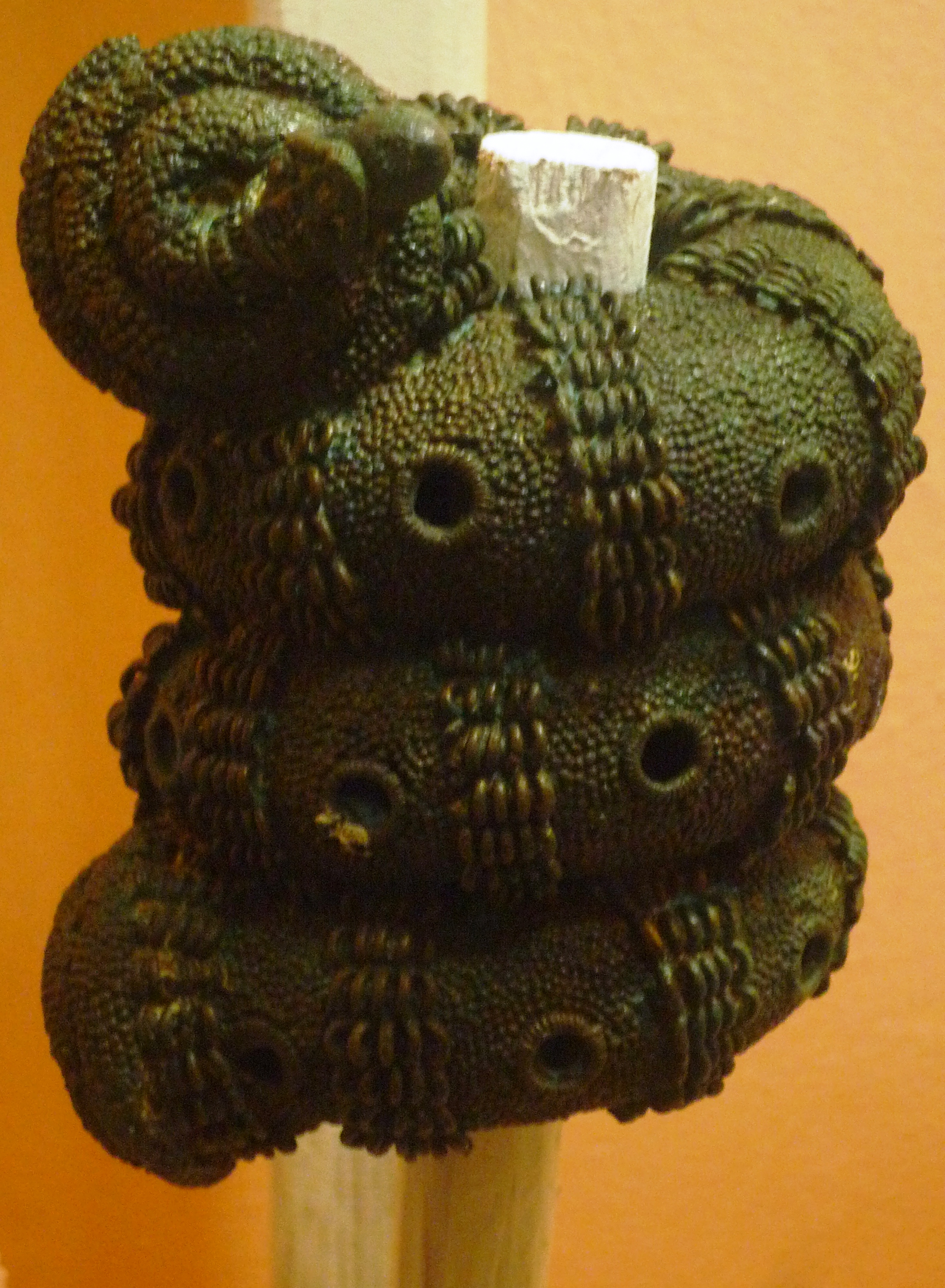
Detailed 9th century bronze of a coiled snake, cast by the lost wax method. Igbo-Ukwu, Nigeria

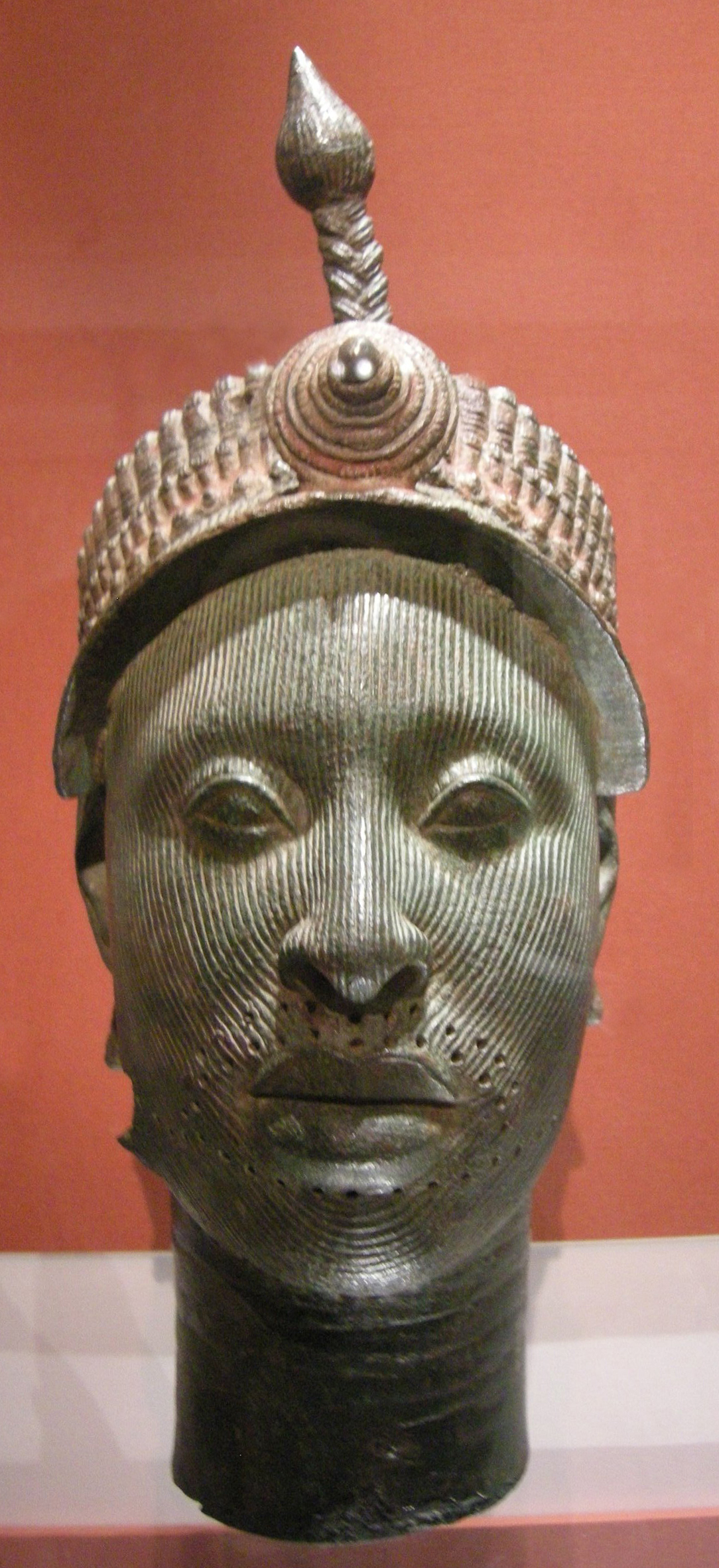
Sculpture from the Ife state using a lost-wax casting technique, Nigeria, late 11th–14th century

Cast bronzes are known to have been produced in Africa by the 9th century AD in Igboland (Igbo-Ukwu) in Nigeria, the 12th century AD in Yorubaland (Ife) and the 15th century AD in the kingdom of Benin. Some portrait heads remain. Benin mastered bronze during the 16th century, produced portraiture and reliefs in the metal using the lost wax process.

=== Egypt ===
The Egyptians were practicing cire perdue from the mid 3rd millennium BC, shown by Early Dynastic bracelets and gold jewellery. Inserted spouts for ewers (copper water vessels) from the Fourth Dynasty (Old Kingdom) were made by the lost-wax method. Hollow castings, such as the Louvre statuette from the Fayum find appeared during the Middle Kingdom, followed by solid cast statuettes (like the squatting, nursing mother, in Brooklyn) of the Second Intermediate/Early New Kingdom. The hollow casting of statues is represented in the New Kingdom by the kneeling statue of Tuthmosis IV (British Museum, London) and the head fragment of Ramesses V (Fitzwilliam Museum, Cambridge). Hollow castings become more detailed and continue into the Eighteenth Dynasty, shown by the black bronze kneeling figure of Tutankhamun (Museum of the University of Pennsylvania). Cire Perdue is used in mass-production during the Late Period to Graeco-Roman times when figures of deities were cast for personal devotion and votive temple offerings. Nude female-shaped handles on bronze mirrors were cast by the lost-wax process.

=== Mediterranean ===
The lost-wax technique came to be known in the Mediterranean during the Bronze Age. It was a major metalworking technique utilized in the ancient Mediterranean world, notably during the Classical period of Greece for large-scale bronze statuary and in the Roman world.

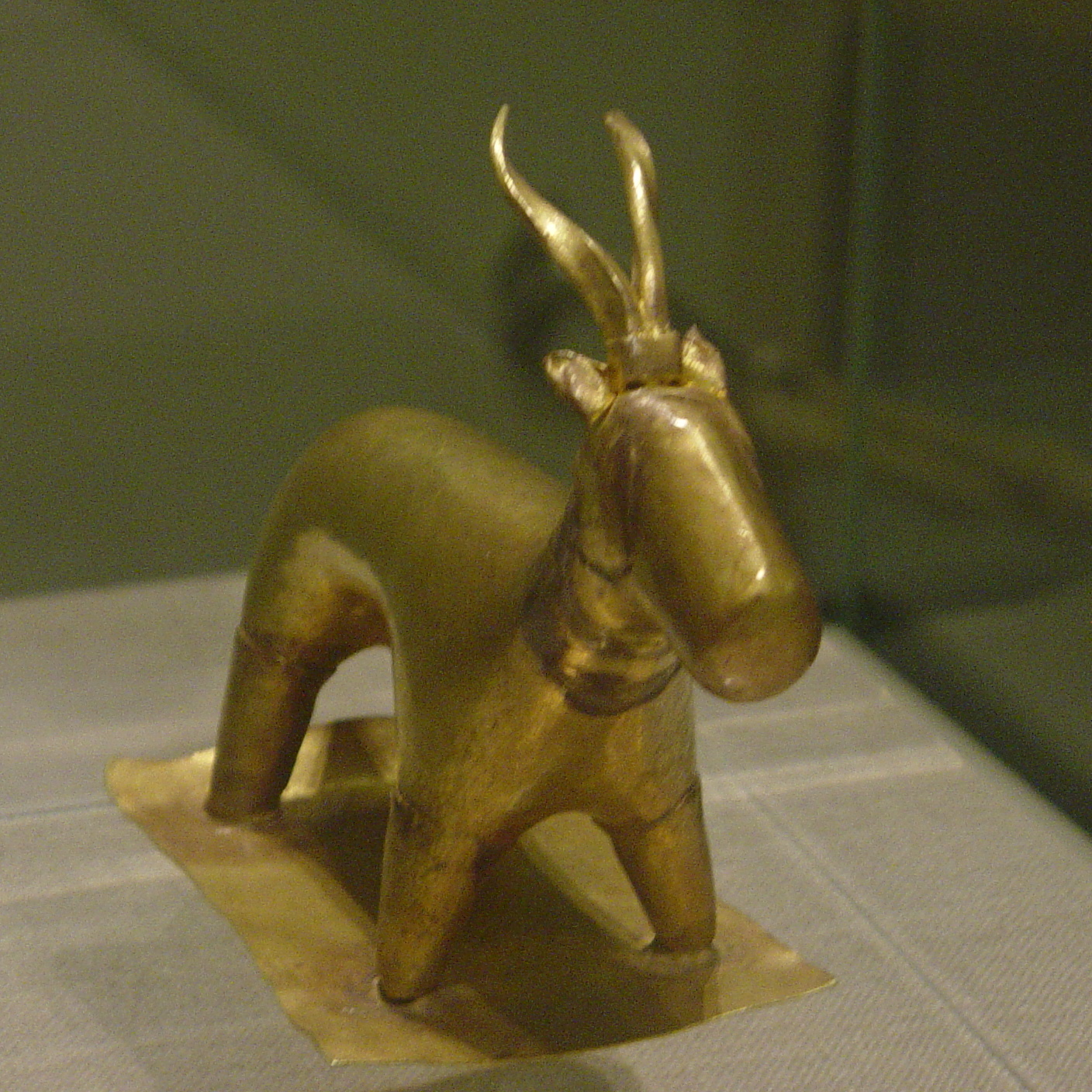
Gold ibex figurine from the Late Cycladic period (17th century BC). About 10cm long with lost-wax cast feet and head and repoussé body, from an excavation on Santorini

Direct imitations and local derivations of Oriental, Syro-Palestinian and Cypriot figurines are found in Late Bronze Age Sardinia, with a local production of figurines from the 11th to 10th century BC. The cremation graves (mainly 8th–7th centuries BC, but continuing until the beginning of the 4th century) from the necropolis of Paularo (Italian Oriental Alps) contained fibulae, pendants and other copper-based objects that were made by the lost-wax process. Etruscan examples, such as the bronze anthropomorphic handle from the Bocchi collection (National Archaeological Museum of Adria), dating back to the 6th to 5th centuries BC, were made by cire perdue. Most of the handles in the Bocchi collection, as well as some bronze vessels found in Adria (Rovigo, Italy) were made using the lost-wax technique. The better known lost-wax produced items from the classical world include the Praying Boy c. 300 BC (in the Berlin Museum), the statue of Hera from Vulci (Etruria), which, like most statues, was cast in several parts which were then joined. Geometric bronzes such as the four copper horses of San Marco (Venice, probably 2nd century) are other prime examples of statues cast in many parts.

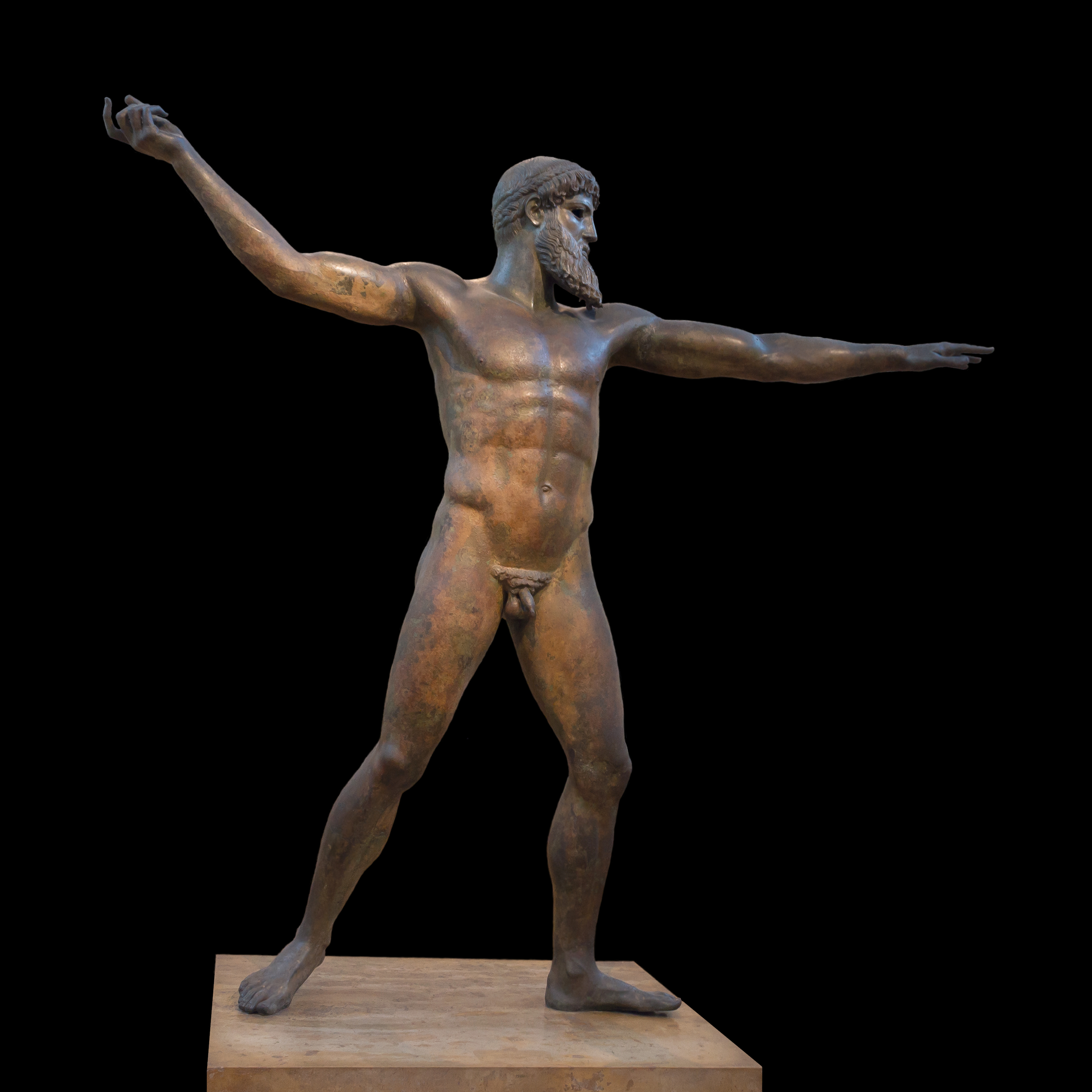
The Artemision Bronze (c. 5th century BC). Lost-wax cast Bronze sculpture. Height 209 cm. Depicts either Zeus or Poseidon. Found near Cape Artemision.

Examples of works made using the lost-wax casting process in Ancient Greece largely are unavailable due to the common practice in later periods of melting down pieces to reuse their materials. Much of the evidence for these products come from shipwrecks. As underwater archaeology became feasible, artifacts lost to the sea became more accessible. Statues like the Artemision Bronze Zeus or Poseidon (found near Cape Artemision), as well as the Victorious Youth (found near Fano), are two such examples of Greek lost-wax bronze statuary that were discovered underwater.

Some Late Bronze Age sites in Cyprus have produced cast bronze figures of humans and animals. One example is the male figure found at Enkomi. Three objects from Cyprus (held in the Metropolitan Museum of Art in New York) were cast by the lost-wax technique from the 13th and 12th centuries BC, namely, the amphorae rim, the rod tripod, and the cast tripod.

Other, earlier examples that show this assembly of lost-wax cast pieces include the bronze head of the Chatsworth Apollo and the bronze head of Aphrodite from Satala (Turkey) from the British Museum.

=== East Asia ===
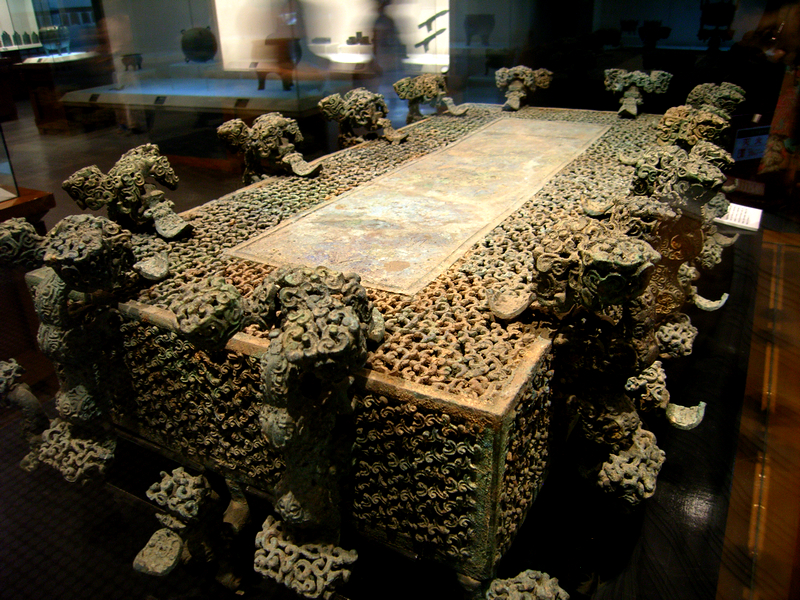
Bronze ritual altar with extensive patterns. From the State of Chu in central China, before 552 BC

There is great variability in the use of the lost-wax method in East Asia. The casting method to make bronzes till the early phase of Eastern Zhou (770–256 BC) was almost invariably section-mold process. Starting from around 600 BC, there was an unmistakable rise of lost-wax casting in the central plains of China, first witnessed in the Chu cultural sphere. Further investigations have revealed this not to be the case as it is clear that the piece-mould casting method was the principal technique used to manufacture bronze vessels in China. The lost-wax technique did not appear in northern China until the 6th century BC. Lost-wax casting is known as rōgata in Japanese, and dates back to the Yayoi period, c. 200 BC. The most famous piece made by cire perdue is the bronze image of a Buddha in the temple of the Todaiji monastery at Nara. It was made in sections between 743 and 749, allegedly using seven tons of wax.

=== Northern Europe ===
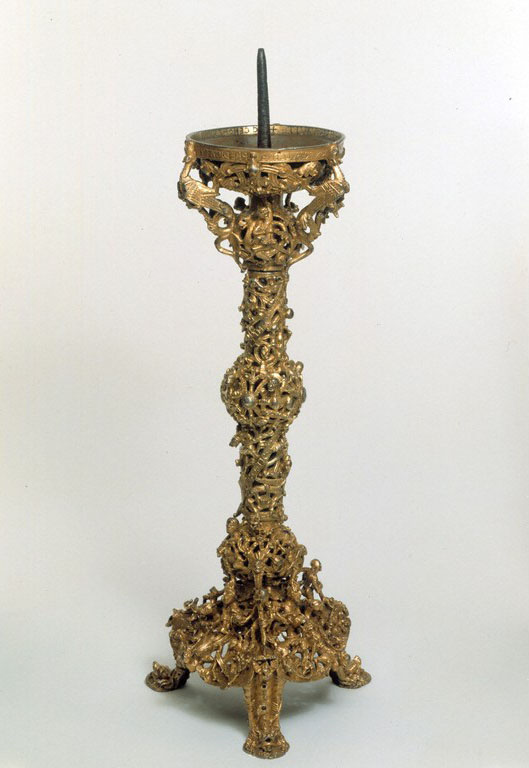
The Gloucester Candlestick, England, early 12th century, V&A Museum no. 7649-1861

The Dunaverney (1050–910 BC) and Little Thetford (1000–701 BC) flesh-hooks have been shown to be made using a lost-wax process. The Little Thetford flesh-hook, in particular, employed distinctly inventive construction methods. The intricate Gloucester Candlestick (1104–1113 AD) was made as a single-piece wax model, then given a complex system of gates and vents before being invested in a mould.

=== Americas ===
The lost-wax casting tradition was developed by the peoples of Nicaragua, Costa Rica, Panama, Colombia, northwest Venezuela, Andean America, and the western portion of South America. Lost-wax casting produced some of the region's typical gold wire and delicate wire ornament, such as fine ear ornaments. The process was employed in prehispanic times in Colombia's Muisca and Sinú cultural areas. Two lost-wax moulds, one complete and one partially broken, were found in a shaft and chamber tomb in the vereda of Pueblo Tapado in the municipio of Montenegro (Department of Quindío), dated roughly to the pre-Columbian period. The lost-wax method did not appear in Mexico until the 10th century, and was thereafter used in western Mexico to make a wide range of bell forms.

== Literary history ==
=== Indirect evidence ===
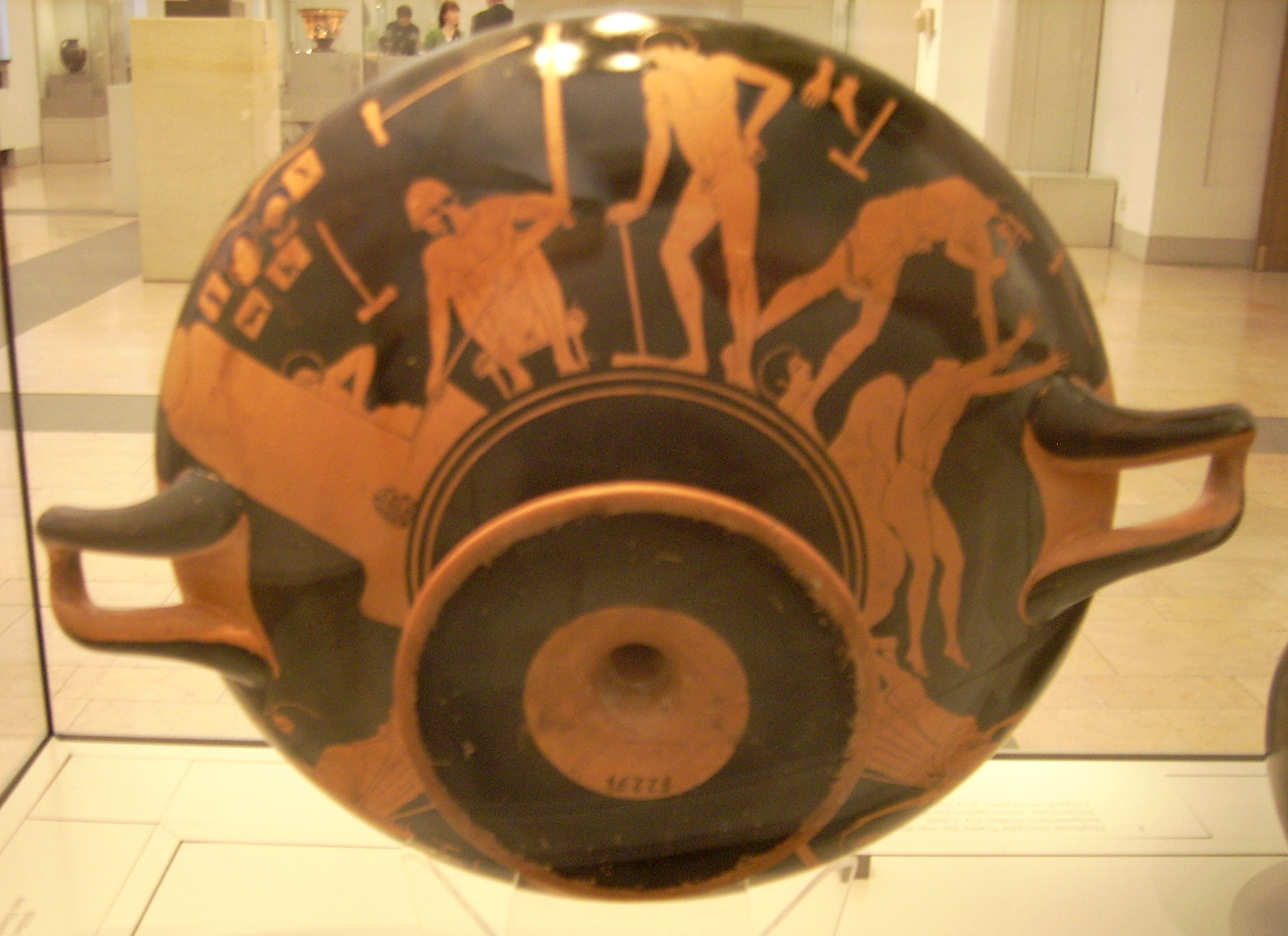
The Berlin Foundry Cup, early 5th century BC

Some early literary works allude to lost-wax casting. Columella, a Roman writer of the 1st century AD, mentions the processing of wax from beehives in De Re Rustica, perhaps for casting, as does Pliny the Elder, who details a sophisticated procedure for making Punic wax. One Greek inscription refers to the payment of craftsmen for their work on the Erechtheum in Athens (408/7–407/6 BC). Clay-modellers may use clay moulds to make terracotta negatives for casting or to produce wax positives. Pliny portrays Zenodorus as a well-reputed ancient artist producing bronze statues, and describes Lysistratos of Sikyon, who takes plaster casts from living faces to create wax casts using the indirect process.

Many bronze statues or parts of statues in antiquity were cast using the lost wax process. Theodorus of Samos is commonly associated with bronze casting. Pliny also mentions the use of lead, which is known to help molten bronze flow into all areas and parts of complex moulds. Quintilian documents the casting of statues in parts, whose moulds may have been produced by the lost wax process. Scenes on the early-5th century BC Berlin Foundry Cup depict the creation of bronze statuary working, probably by the indirect method of lost-wax casting.

=== Direct evidence ===
==== India ====
The lost-wax method is well documented in ancient Indian literary sources. The Shilpa Shastras, a text from the Gupta Period (c. 320–550 AD), contains detailed information about casting images in metal. The 5th-century AD Vishnusamhita, an appendix to the Vishnu Purana, refers directly to the modeling of wax for making metal objects in chapter XIV: "if an image is to be made of metal, it must first be made of wax." Chapter 68 of the ancient Sanskrit text Mānasāra Silpa details casting idols in wax and is entitled Maduchchhista Vidhānam, or the "lost wax method". The 12th century text Mānasollāsa, allegedly written by King Someshvara III of the Western Chalukya Empire, also provides detail about lost-wax and other casting processes.

In a 16th-century treatise, the Uttarabhaga of the Śilparatna written by Srïkumāra, verses 32 to 52 of Chapter 2 ("Linga Lakshanam"), give detailed instructions on making a hollow casting.

==== Theophilus ====
An early medieval writer Theophilus Presbyter, believed to be the Benedictine monk and metalworker Roger of Helmarshausen, wrote a treatise in the early-to-mid-12th century that includes original work and copied information from other sources, such as the Mappae clavicula and Eraclius, De dolorous et artibus Romanorum. It provides step-by-step procedures for making various articles, some by lost-wax casting: "The Copper Wind Chest and Its Conductor" (Chapter 84); "Tin Cruets" (Chapter 88), and "Casting Bells" (Chapter 85), which call for using "tallow" instead of wax; and "The Cast Censer". In Chapters 86 and 87 Theophilus details how to divide the wax into differing ratios before moulding and casting to achieve accurately tuned small musical bells. The 16th-century Florentine sculptor Benvenuto Cellini may have used Theophilus' writings when he cast his bronze Perseus with the Head of Medusa.

==== America ====
The Spanish writer Releigh (1596) in a brief account refers to Aztec casting.

== Gallery ==
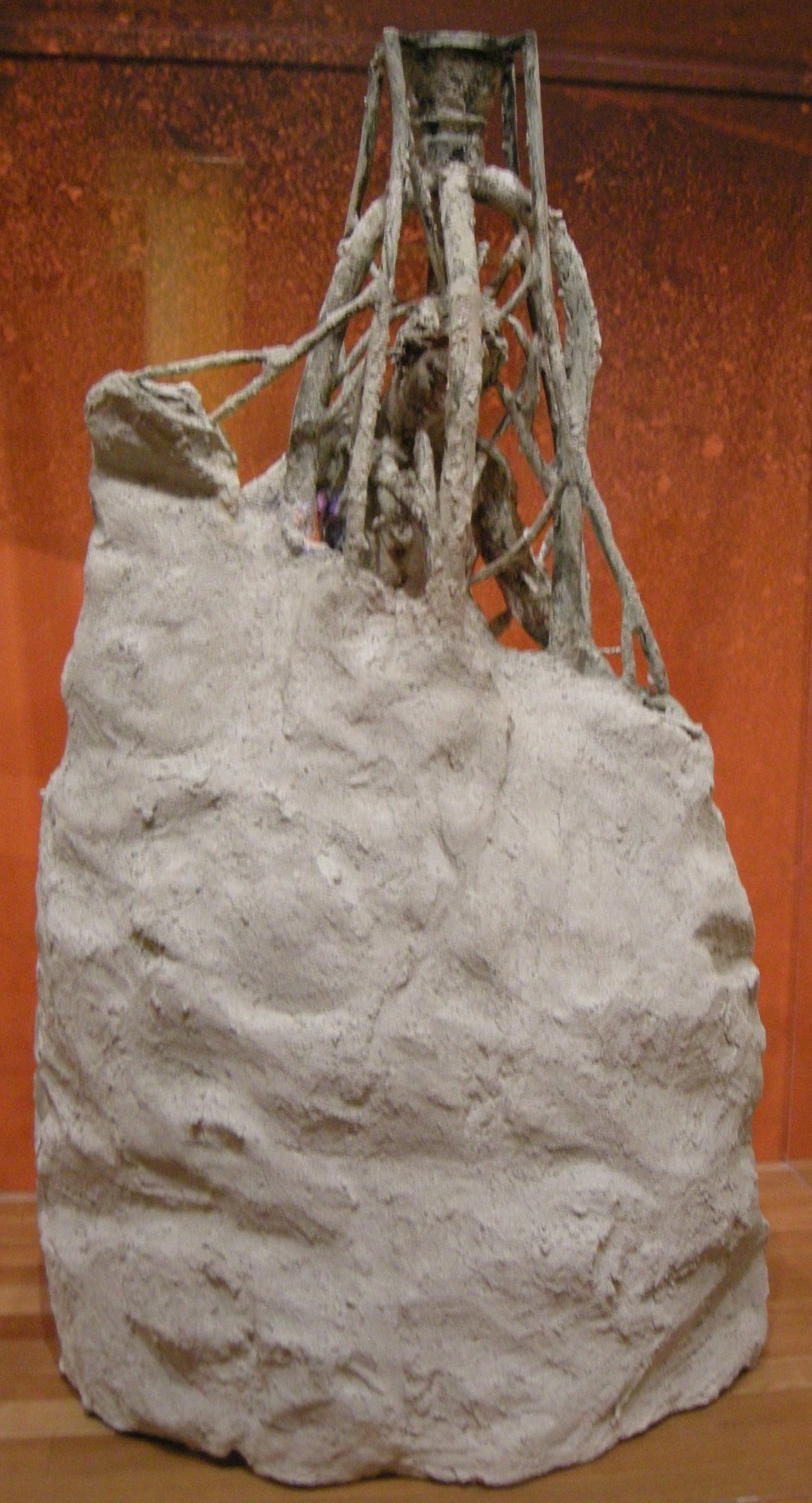
A wax model is sprued with vents for casting metal and for the release of air, and covered in heat-resistant material.

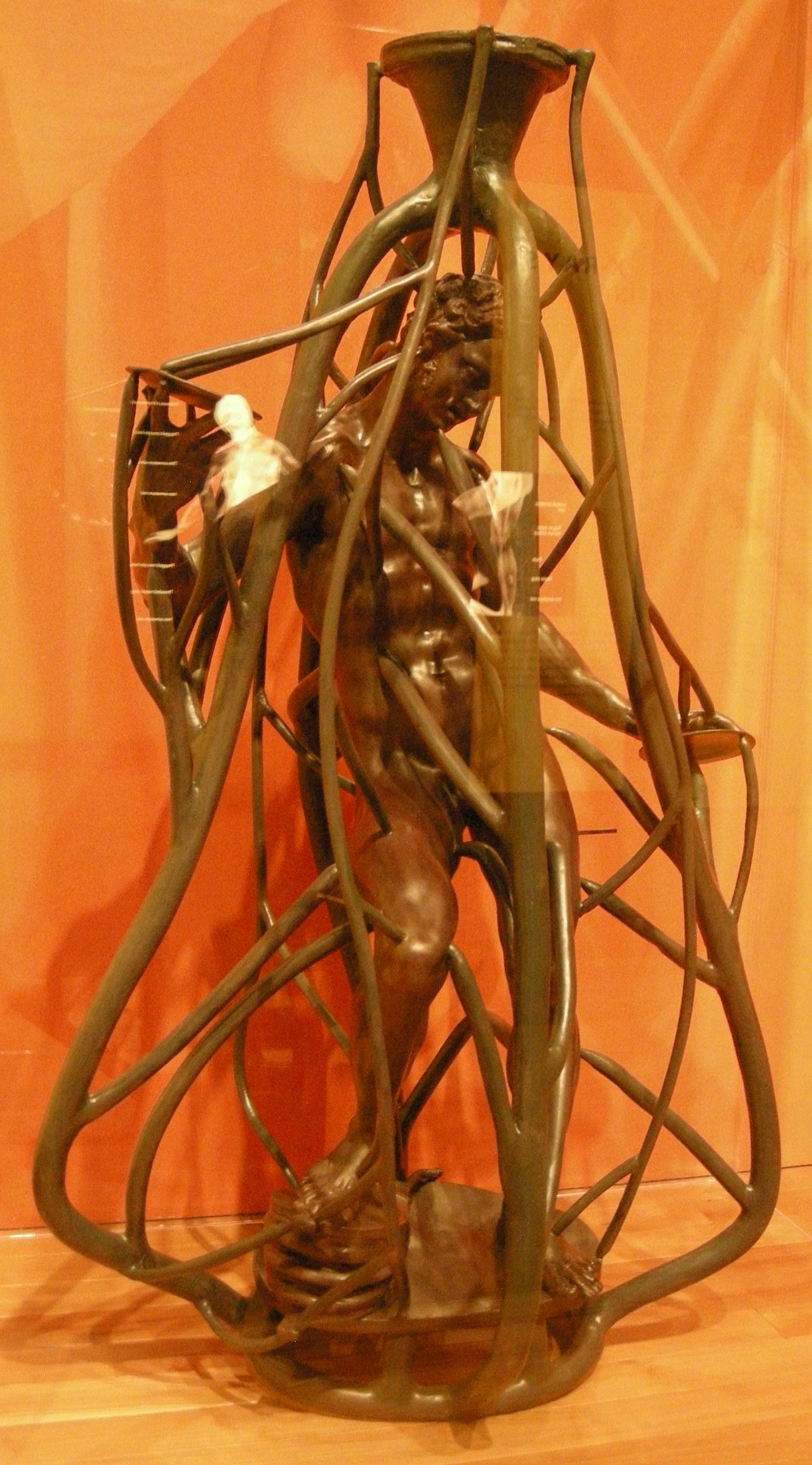
A cast in bronze, still with spruing

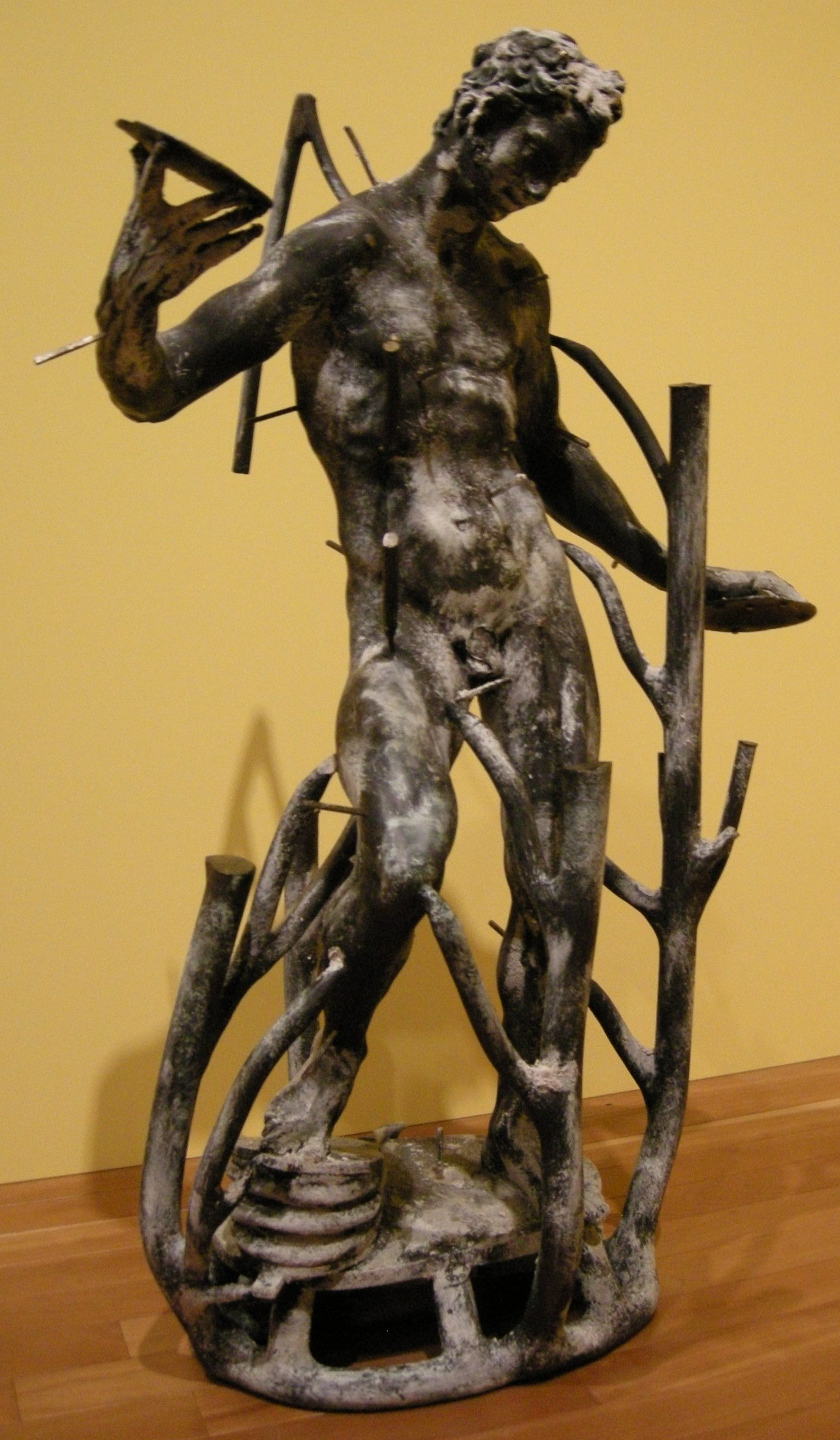
A bronze cast, with part of the spruing cut away

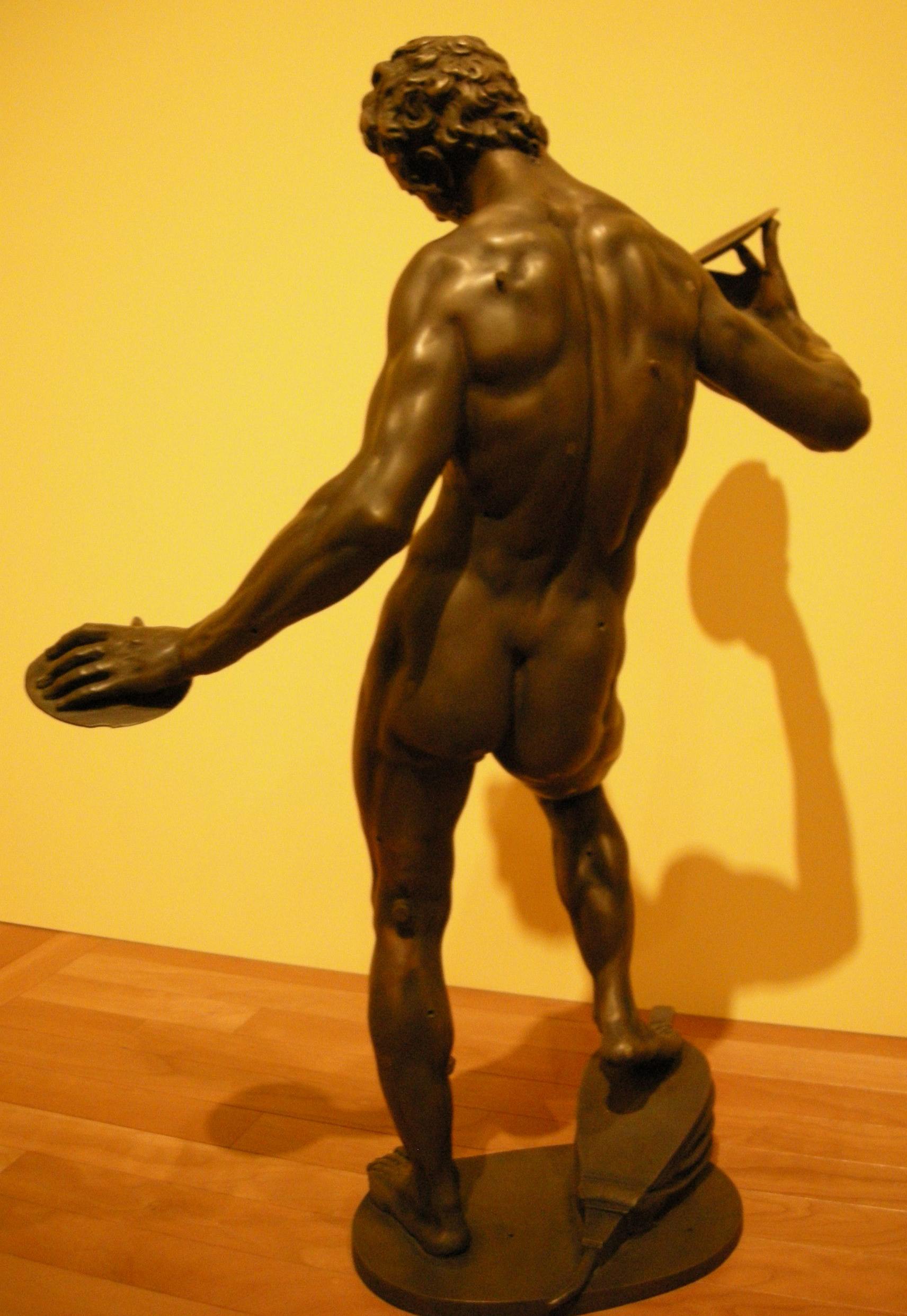
A nearly finished bronze casting. Only the core supports have yet to be removed and closed.

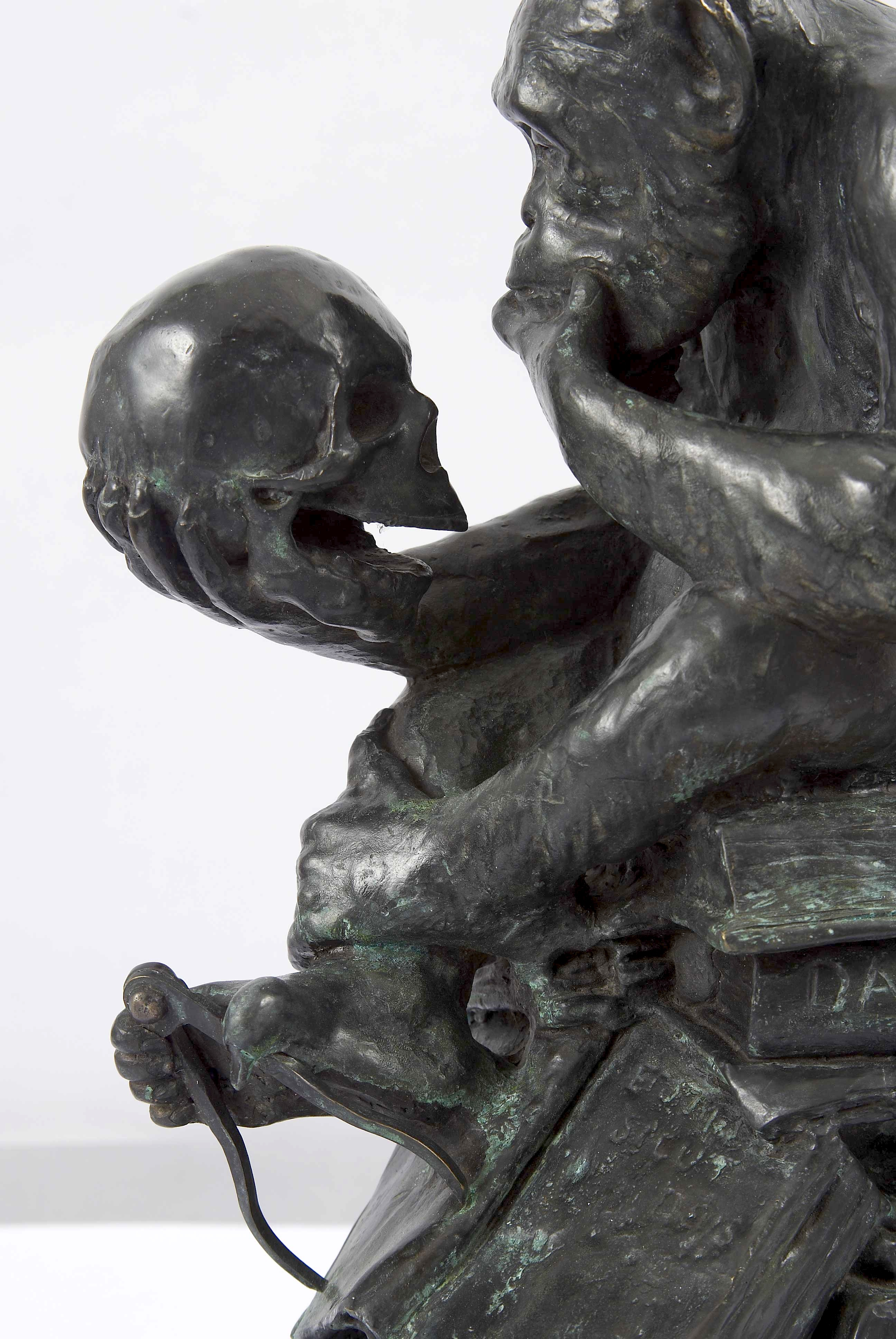
Hugo Rheinhold's Affe mit Schädel is cast out of bronze using the lost-wax process.
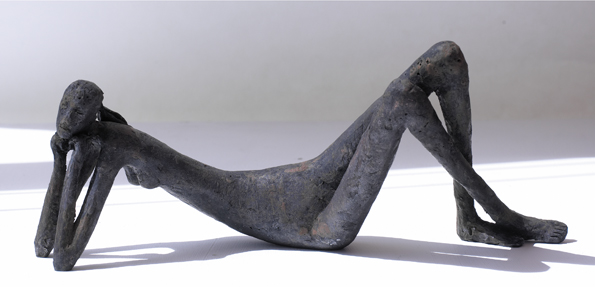
This bronze piece entitled Lazy Lady, by the sculptor Rowan Gillespie was cast using the lost-wax process.

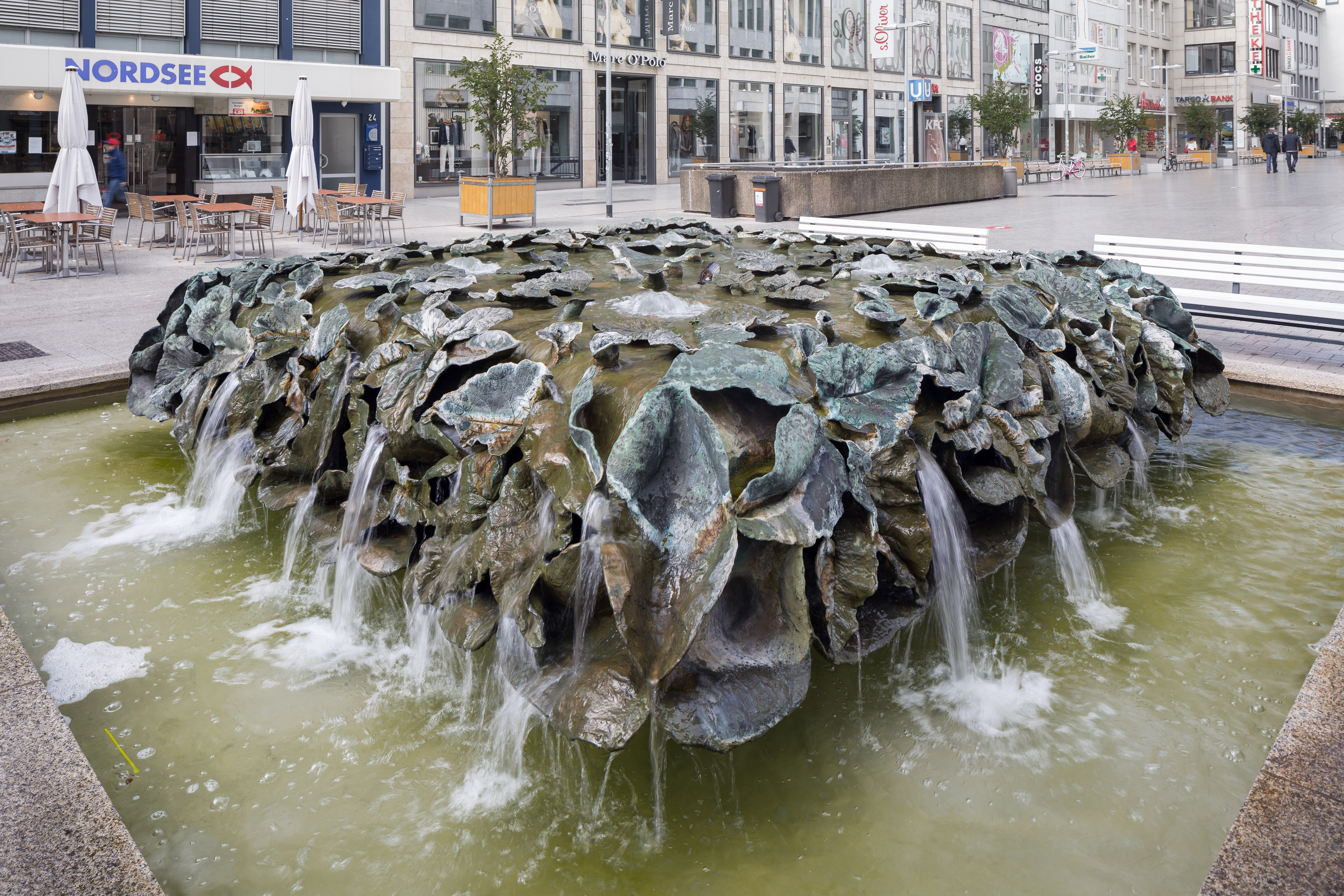
The Blätterbrunnen of 1976 by Emil Cimiotti, as seen 2014 in the city center of Hanover, Germany. A lost-wax method was used for the bronze leaves.

The Immigrants, Migration Museum, Adelaide, Australia (2006)

== See also ==
- Fusible core injection molding

== Sources ==
- Forbes, R.J. (1971). Metallurgy in Antiquity, Part 1: Early metallurgy, the smith and his tools, gold, silver, and lead, zinc, and bronze. Studies in Ancient Technology. Vol. 8. Brill. ISBN 978-90-04-02652-0.
- Hart, G.H.; Keeley, G. (1945). Metal Work for Craftsmen. London, UK: Sir Isaac Pitman & Sons.
- Hodges, H. (1995) [1864]. Artifacts. Bloomsbury Academic. ISBN 978-0-7156-2316-9.
- Jones, D.M., ed. (2001). Archaeometallurgy. London, UK: English Heritage.
- Konkova, L.V.; Korol, G.G. "South Siberian imports in eastern Europe in the 10th—13th centuries: Traditions of metalworking". In Archaeometallurgy in Europe (2003).
- Long, S. (October 1964). "Cire Perdue Copper Casting in Pre-Columbian Mexico: An Experimental Approach". American Antiquity. 30 (2): 189–192. doi:10.2307/278850. JSTOR 278850. S2CID 163771730.
- McArthur, M. (2005). The Arts of Asia: Materials, techniques, styles. London, UK: Thames & Hudson.
- Maddin, Robert, ed. (21–26 October 1986). The beginning of the Use of Metals and Alloys. Second International Conference on the Beginning of the Use of Metals and Alloys. Zhengzhou, China: MIT Press. ISBN 978-0-262-13232-9. OCLC 644557973.
- Maddin, Robert (1988). The Beginning of the Use of Metals and Alloys. The MIT Press. ISBN 978-0-262-13232-9.
- Noble, J.V. (October 1975). "The wax of the lost wax process". American Journal of Archaeology. 79 (4): 368–9. doi:10.2307/503070. JSTOR 503070. S2CID 193070936.
- Peng, Peng (2020). Metalworking in Bronze Age China: The Lost-Wax Process. Cambria Press. ISBN 978-1-60497-962-6. Archived from the original on 2 January 2022.
- Taylor, S.E. (1978). Dark-Age metal casting: An experimental investigation into the possibility of using wax models for the formation of clay-piece moulds, with special reference to the manufacture of pairs of cast objects (Report). The Department of Archaeology Cardiff. Vol. 97. University of Cardiff.
- Trench, Lucy (2000). Materials & Techniques in the Decorative Arts: An illustrated dictionary. University of Chicago Press. ISBN 978-0-226-81200-7 – via Internet Archive (archive.org).
- Proceedings. Archaeometallurgy in Europe: International Conference. Milan, IT: Associazione Italiana di Metallurgia. 24–26 September 2003. ISBN 978-88-85298-50-7.
