= Little Thetford flesh-hook =

Archaeological artefact

Little Thetford flesh hook
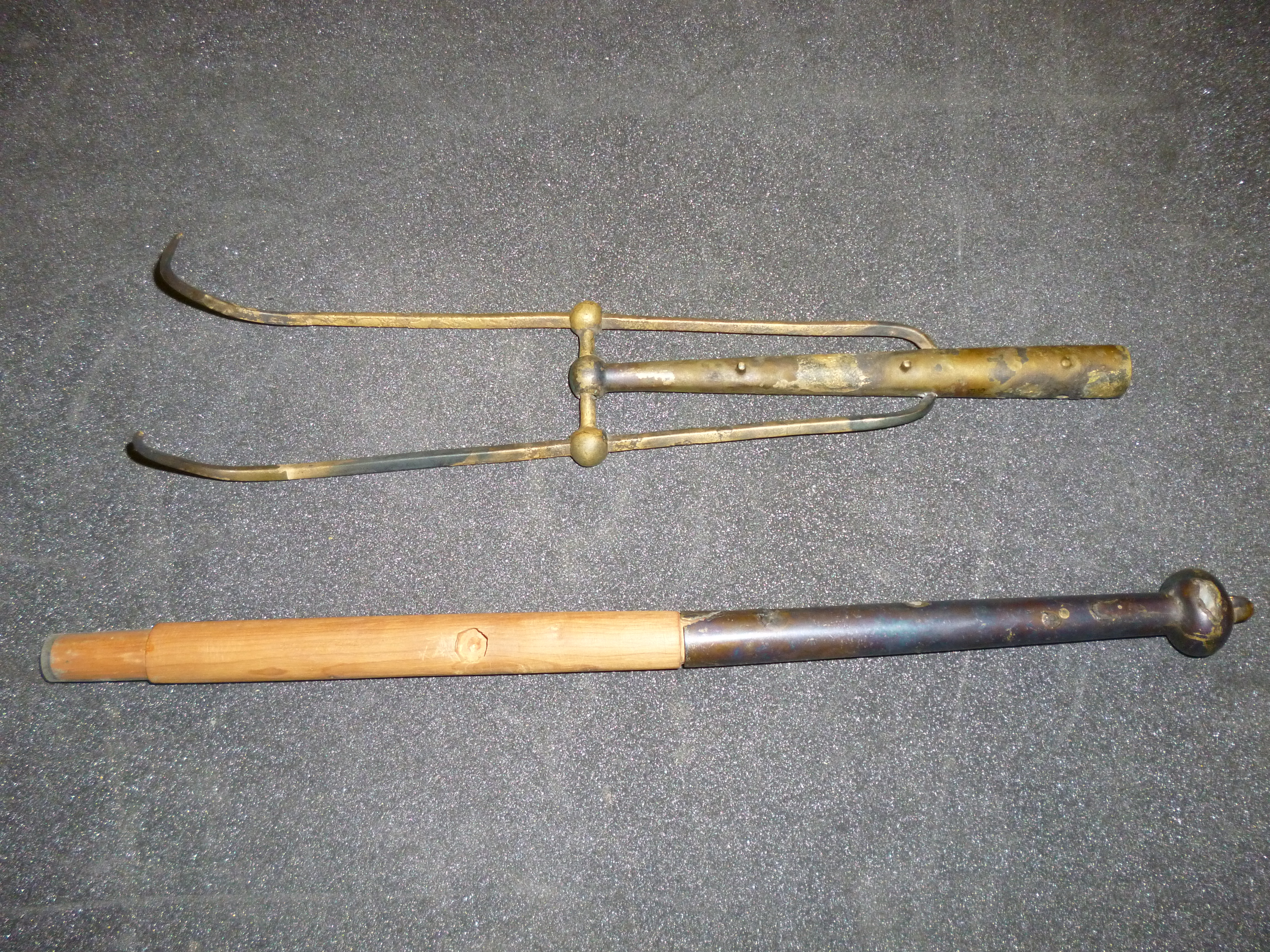
- Material: Bronze
- Size: Hooked part length:12 in (30 cm) weight:9 oz (255 g); Butt end length:6 in (15 cm) weight:4 oz (113 g)
- Created: late Bronze Age (1150 – 950 BC)
- Discovered: 1929, Little Thetford
- Present location: British Museum
- Identification: CHER 06956

The Little Thetford flesh-hook is a late Bronze-Age (1150 – 950 BC) artefact discovered in 1929 in Little Thetford, near Ely, Cambridgeshire, England. A flesh-hook is a metal hook with a long handle used to pull meat out of a pot or hides out of tan-pits. This particular find is one of 32 other such archaeologically significant finds, scatters, and excavations within 1 square mile (2.6 km^{2}) of Little Thetford.

== Discovery ==
The artefact was found by a Mr Dresser, whilst digging a ditch on reclaimed fenland, at Little Thetford in 1929. Discovered about 9 feet (2.7 m) down, it consisted of two-parts, connected by the remains of a wooden shaft. The wood remains have not survived; a contemporary wooden shaft has been added by the British Museum for display purposes. The artefact is in the British Museum though is not, as of 2012, on display. Within 1 square mile (2.6 km^{2}) of Little Thetford, there have been 33 finds of various kinds over the years, such as flints from the Neolithic era through to a windmill of the late Medieval period.

== Uses ==
The word flesh-hook is relatively modern. The OED gives the origin of the word as 1325 AD, and defines it as a metal hook with a long stail, used to pull hides out of tan-pits or as a hook for pulling meat from the pot. It may also have been used as a tool to prod animals. The use of this flesh-hook in the Bronze Age can only be speculated.

== Construction ==
The metal used in the construction is a bronze alloy, found to be typical of the late Bronze Age. The material was analysed using ICP – AES and contained (approximately) 85% copper, 10% tin, 3% lead, and 2% impurities; although the constituents of the individual parts varied around these figures. From an analysis of 36 other Bronze-Age flesh-hooks known to be in existence, the assembled length of hook-part, butt-end, and missing wood part is speculated to be 2.5 feet (0.76 m).

The artefact was manufactured by casting, using a mould in a lost-wax (cire perdue) process.

== Dating ==
The British Museum dates the artefact within the Bronze Age 1150 – 950 BC. The Cambridgeshire Historic Environment Record database dates the artefact as late Bronze Age 1000–701 BC.

== See also ==
- Dunaverney flesh-hook
- Lost wax casting
