= Flesh-hook =

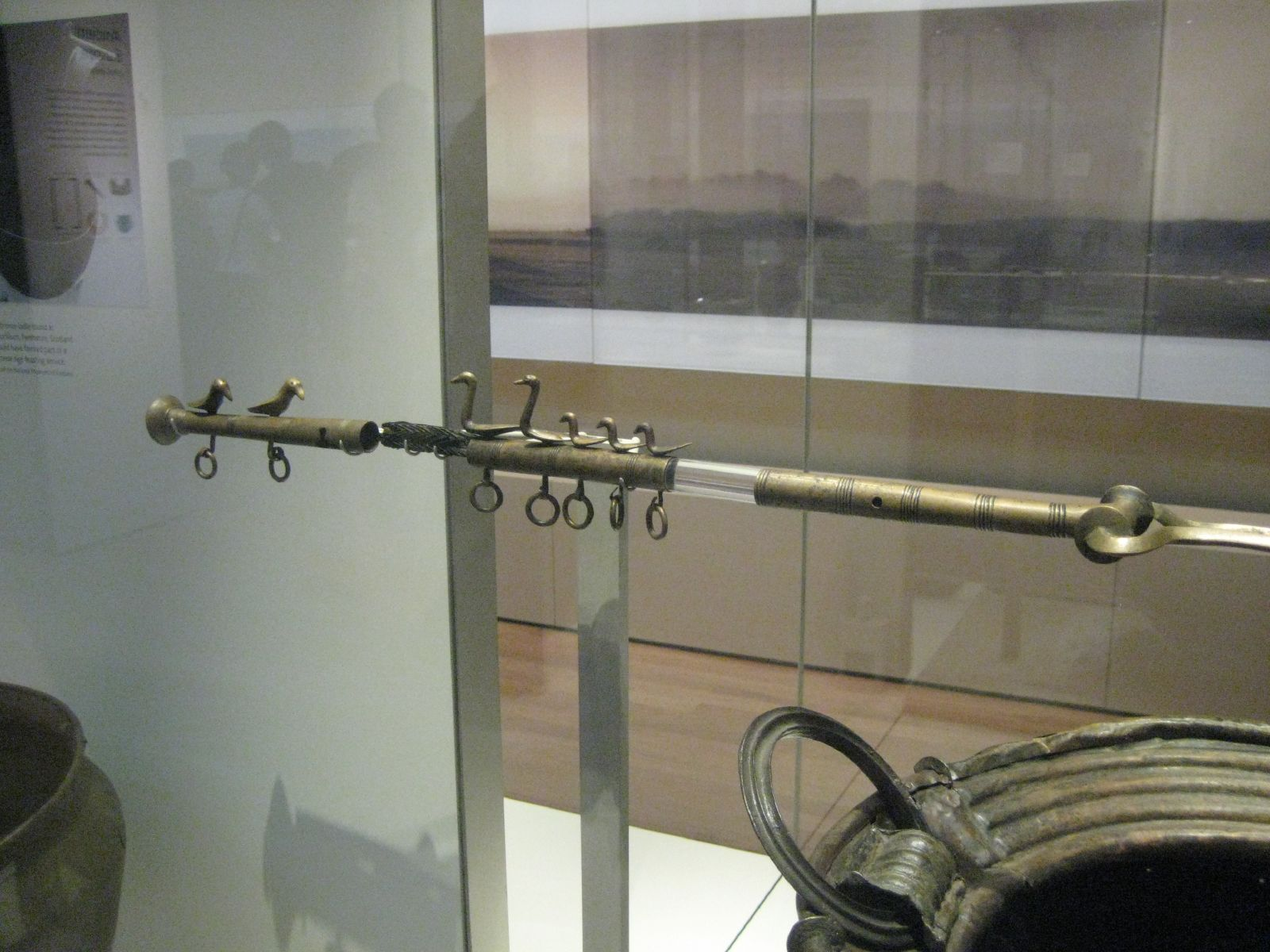
The Dunaverney flesh-hook, Bronze Age Ireland

Flesh-hook is a term for a variety of archaeological artifacts which have metal hooks and a long handle, or socket for a lost wooden handle. Though the term may be applied to objects from other times and places, it is especially associated with the European Bronze Age and Iron Age. The metal shaft divides to form between two and five hooks with some sort of sharpened end. The purposes of the objects probably include pulling meat out of a pot or hides out of tan-pits.

Some are plain in design but many are elaborately decorated, and if related to food, are clearly for the feasting hall rather than the kitchen (if such a distinction existed); some have been found with cauldrons and other large vessels. Some Bronze Age types are regarded as ritual objects, perhaps never actually used for a practical purpose. The division and serving of meat at feasts and after sacrifices was a matter of great social significance, and some tension, in several cultures, as we know from early literatures; it is recorded as leading to fatal violence in both classical Greece and Irish mythology (see Champion's portion).

It may also have been used as a tool to prod animals.

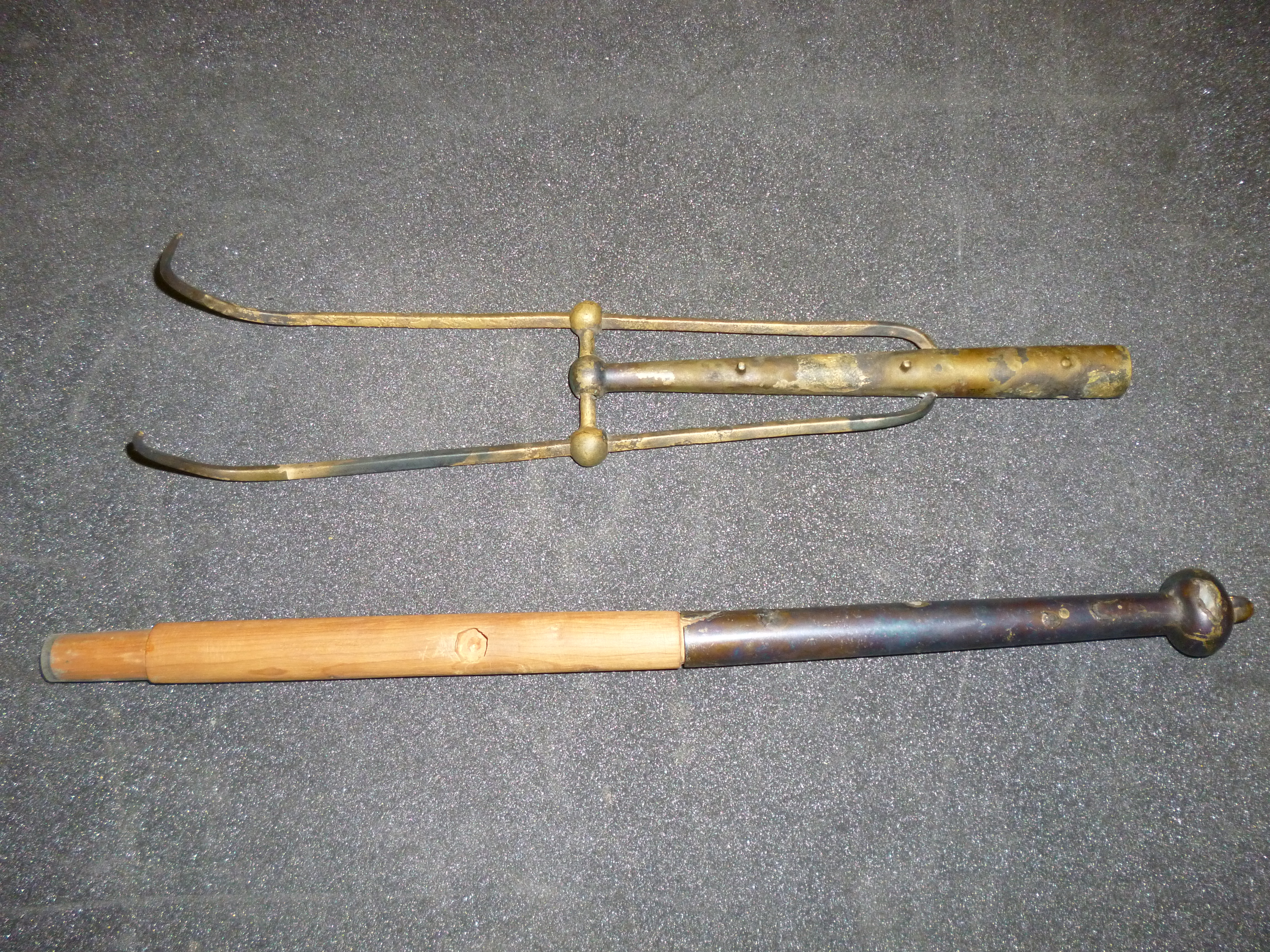
The Late Bronze Age Little Thetford flesh-hook (with modern wood section), England

== History ==
The Hebrew Bible/Old Testament contains passages referring to the use of flesh-hooks, one with three hooks, being used by Israelite priests to pull meat out of a cauldron. The cauldron contained meat from sacrificed animals being cooked in a liquid ( 1 Samuel 2:13–14).

There are only thirty-six known flesh-hooks from the Atlantic Bronze Age (2300 – 600 BC) Many more Iron Age examples exist.

Notable examples:

- The very elaborate Bronze Age Dunaverney flesh-hook, found in County Antrim, Northern Ireland
- The Bronze Age Little Thetford flesh-hook, found in Cambridgeshire, England

== The word ==
The word flesh-hook is relatively modern. The OED gives the origin of the word as 1325 AD, and defines it as "a metal hook with a long stail, used to pull hides out of tan-pits" or as "a hook for pulling meat from the pot".
