= Dunaverney flesh-hook =

Prehistoric bronze artefact

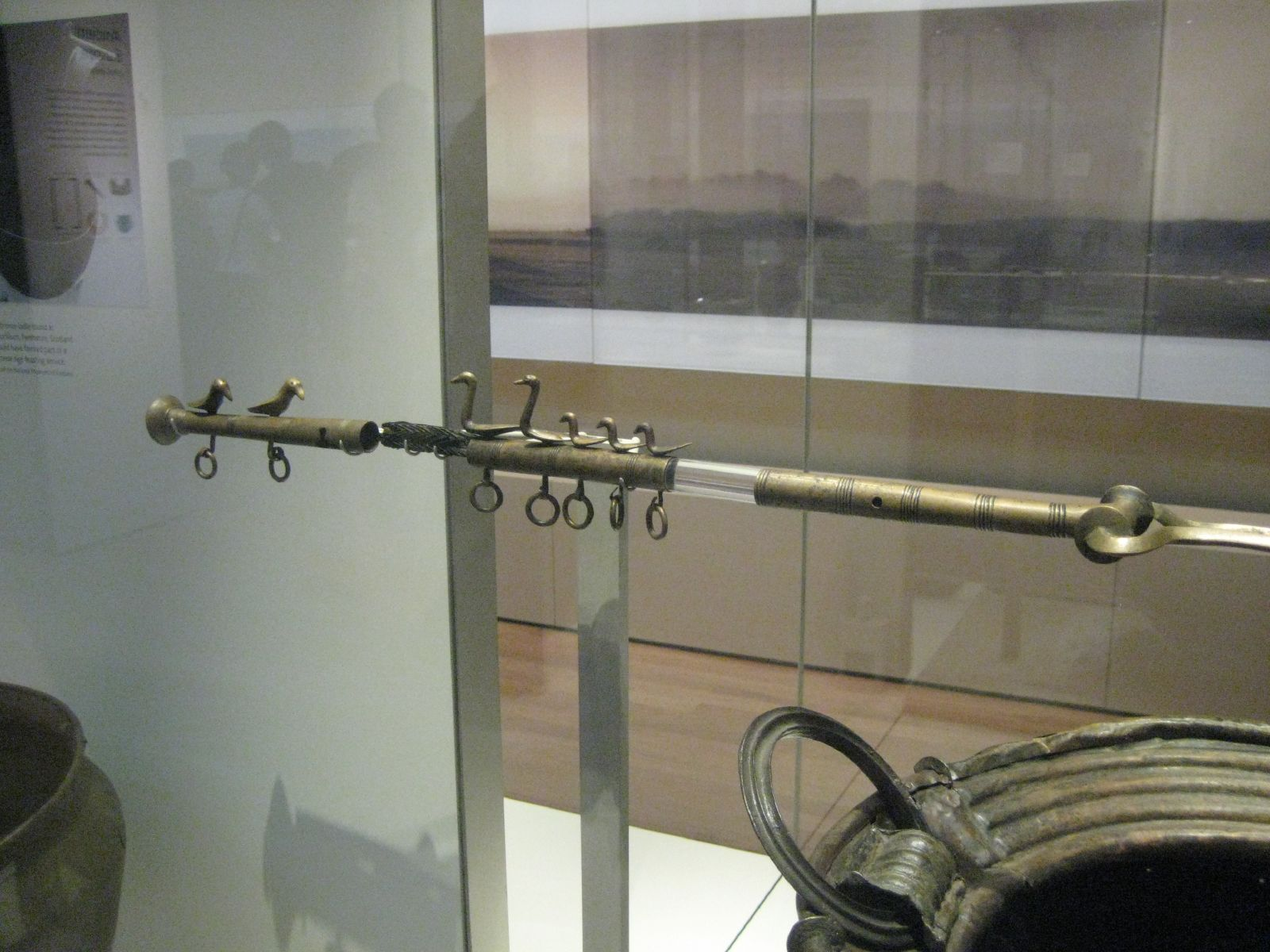
- Dunaverney flesh-hook
- Material: Bronze
- Created: late Bronze Age (1050 BC – 900 BC)
- Discovered: 1829, Garry Bog, Dunaverney, County Antrim
- Present location: British Museum

The Dunaverney Flesh-Hook is a sophisticated bronze artefact from Prehistoric Ireland, thought to be an item of ceremonial feasting gear, and a symbol of authority. It is believed it was used to remove chunks of meat from a stew in a large cauldron for serving. It dates to the Late Bronze Age, between 1050 and 900 BC. Since 1856, it has been in the British Museum in London.

== Description ==
Along the top of the flesh-hook are the figures of five birds, two large ones next to three smaller ones. At the bottom of the shaft, facing the family of five, are two birds. The group of two birds can be identified as corvids, perhaps ravens, the family of five as swans and cygnets. The two sets of birds seem to invoke opposites: birds of water versus birds of the air; white ranged against black, fecundity as opposed to death (implied by the carrion-eating of ravens). The flesh-hook was originally linked by pieces of oak shaft, only one fragment of which remains extant.

== Discovery ==
The Dunaverney Flesh-Hook was discovered in 1829 by workmen who were cutting turf at Dunaverney Bog to the north of Ballymoney in County Antrim. At the time of its discovery, the Dunaverney Flesh-Hook was unparalleled and for a long time many experts could not agree on its age and function. However, as more examples were found, not only in Ireland and Britain, but along the Atlantic seaboard of the European continent, it became clear from their style, technology and context that they belonged to the Bronze Age and were clearly important instruments used during ceremonial feasts. The representation of birds seen on the Dunaverney Flesh-Hook remains unique in north-west Europe.

== See also ==
- Little Thetford flesh-hook

== Gallery ==
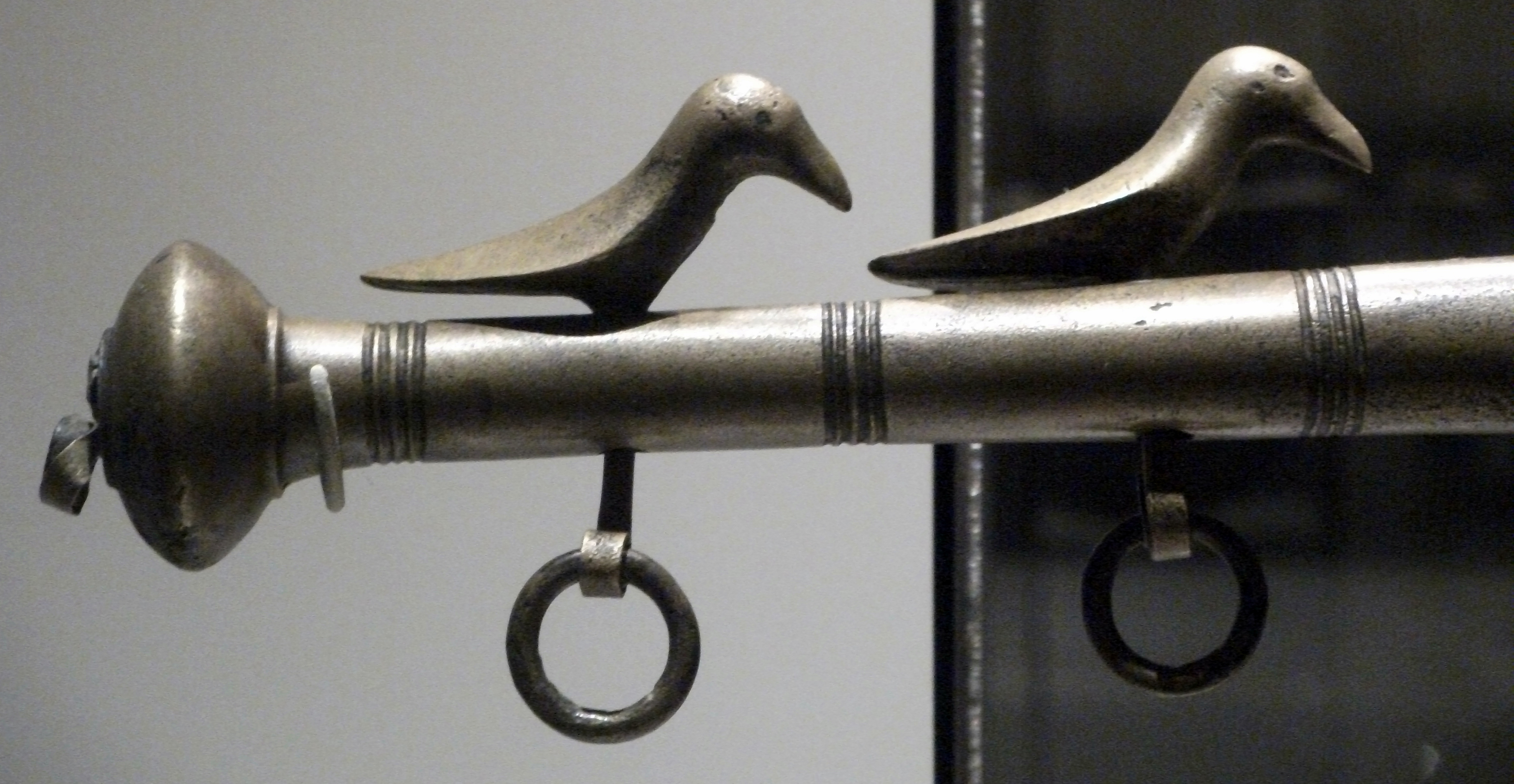
The corvids at the end

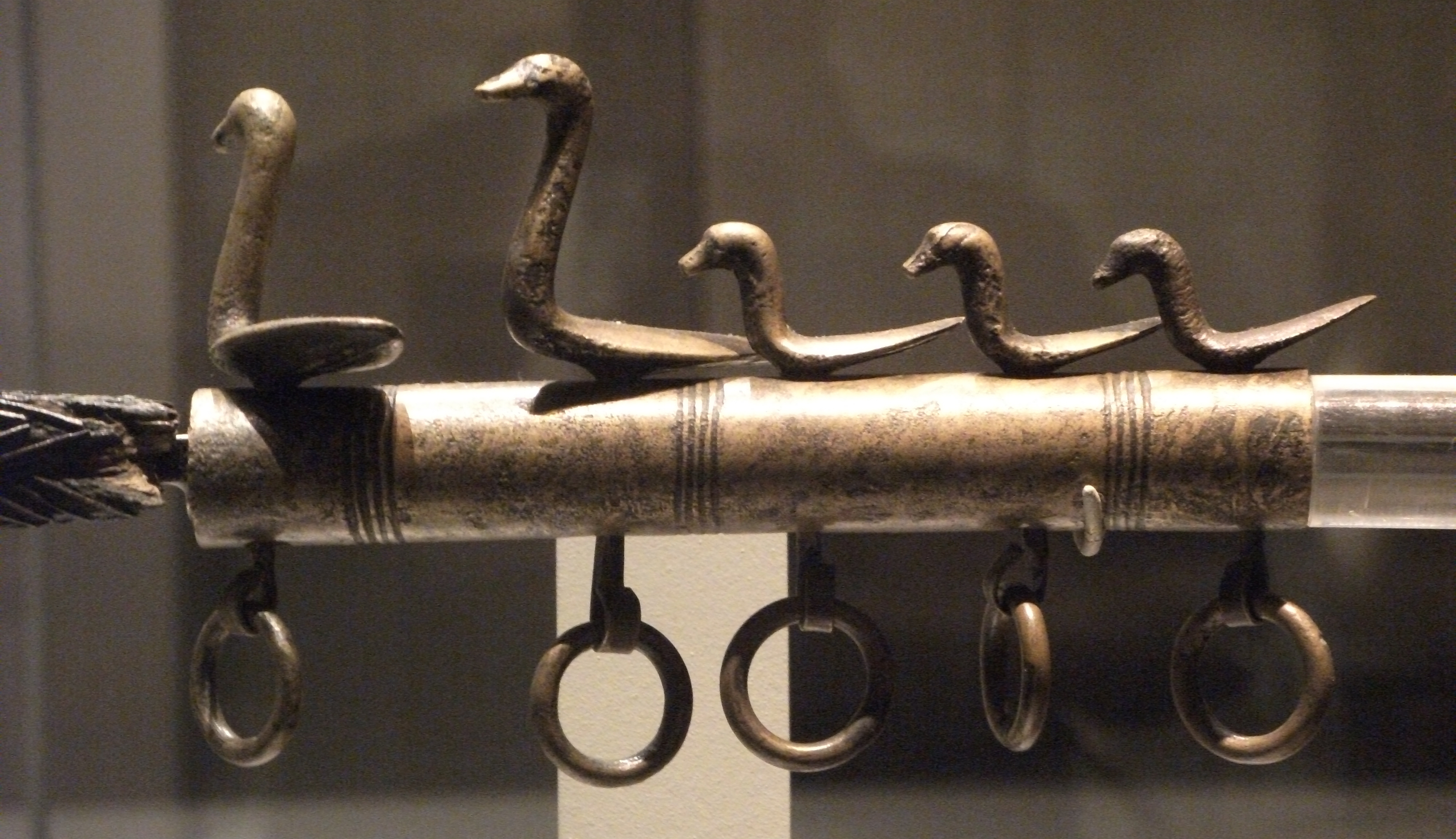
The waterbirds in the middle

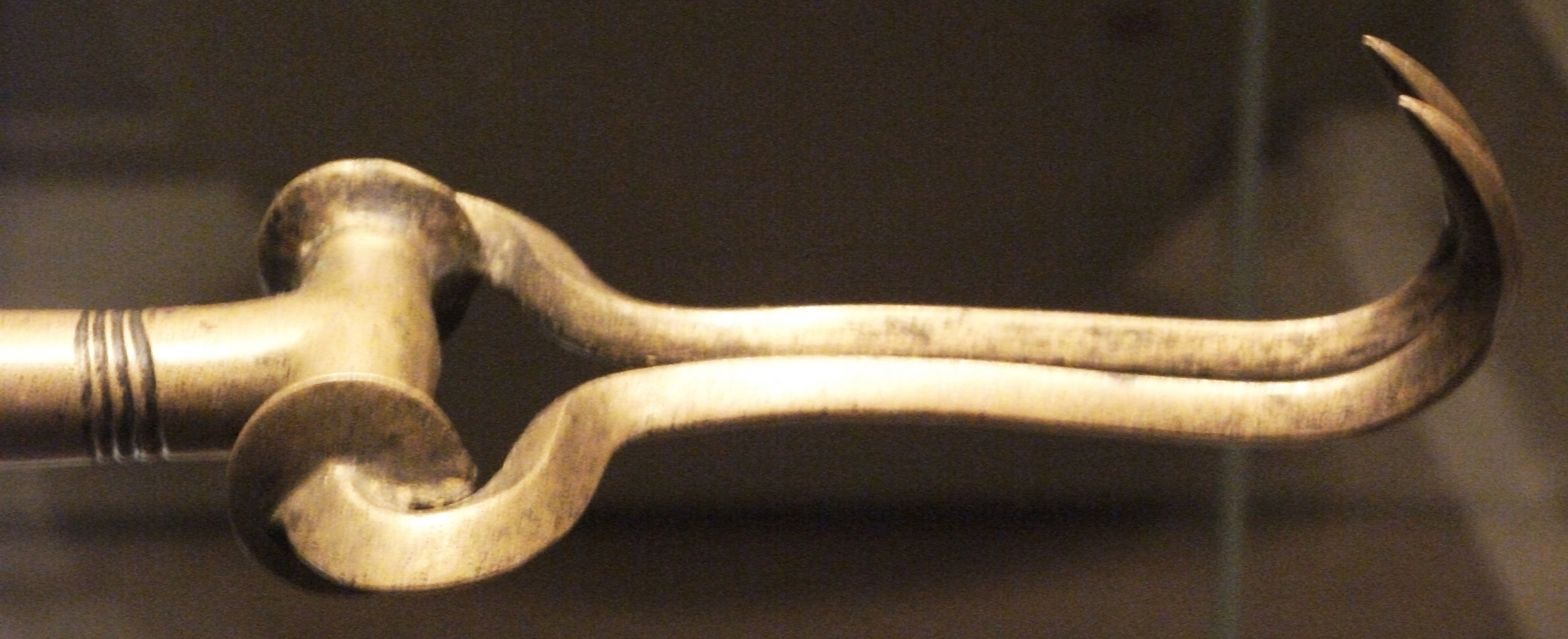
The hook

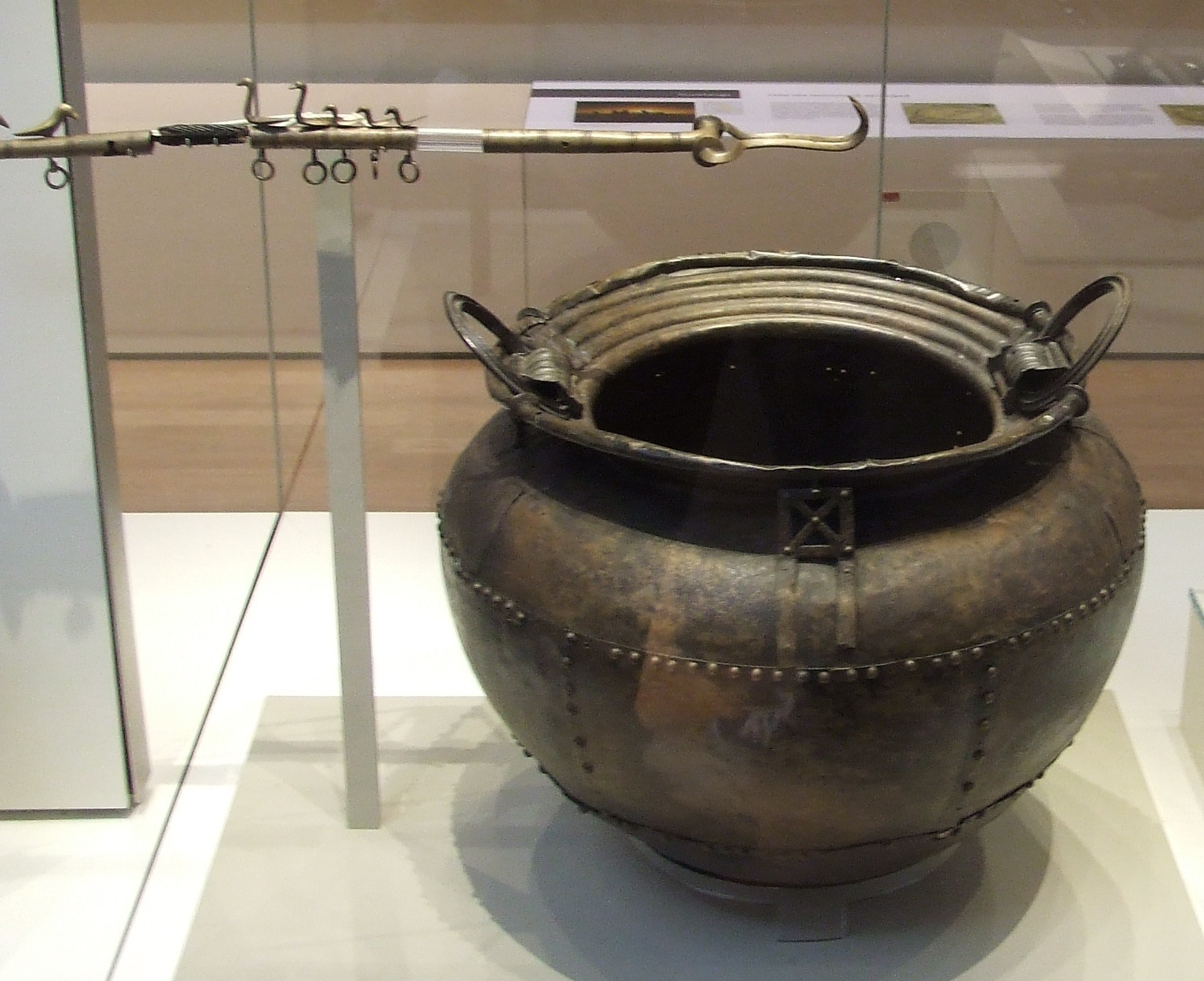
The right-hand side of the flesh-hook (the cauldron is unrelated)
