= Ephebos (disambiguation) =

Ephebos is an Ancient Greek term for an adolescent male.

Ephebos, Ephebe or Ephebus may also refer to:

- Ephebus (personal name), including a list of people with the name
- Ephebe, a fictional place in the Discworld setting
- Ephebe (lichen), a genus of lichen
- Ephebus (beetle), a genus of insects
- Efebos, a 1918 novel by Polish composer Karol Szymanowski

== See also ==
- Ephebic oath, sworn by young men of Classical Athens
- Ephebiphobia, fear of youth
- Ephebophilia, sexual attraction to adolescents
- Ephebopus, a genus of northeastern South American tarantulas
- Kritios Boy, an ancient Greek sculpture
- Marathon Boy, or Ephebe of Marathon, an ancient Greek sculpture
