= Victorious Youth =

Ancient Greek bronze statue

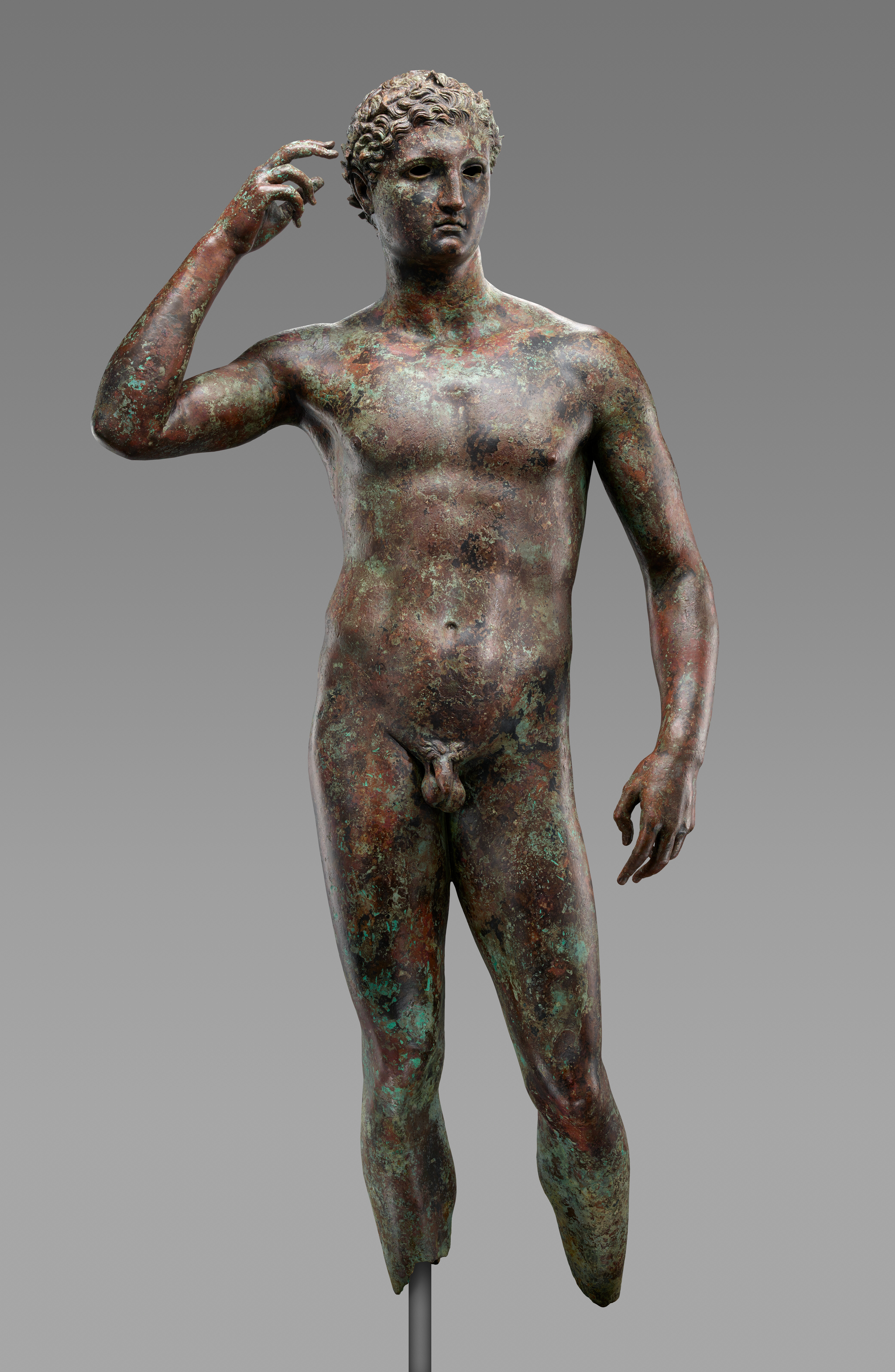
- Artist: Lysippos?
- Completion date: c. 300 BCE – 100 BCE
- Medium: Bronze sculpture
- Subject: An athlete
- Location: Getty Villa

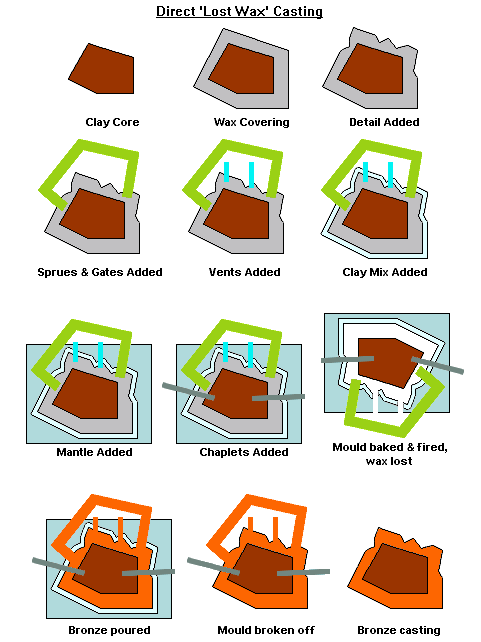
The lost wax technique

The Victorious Youth, also known as the Atleta di Fano, the Lisippo di Fano or the Getty Bronze, is a Greek bronze sculpture, made between 300 and 100 BCE, in the collections of the J. Paul Getty Museum, displayed at the Getty Villa in Pacific Palisades, California.

The Victorious Youth was found in the summer of 1964 in the sea off Fano on the Adriatic coast of Italy, snagged in the nets of an Italian fishing trawler. In the summer of 1977, the J. Paul Getty Museum purchased the bronze. Bernard Ashmole, an archaeologist and art historian, was asked to inspect the sculpture by Munich art dealer Heinz Herzer; he and other scholars attributed it to Lysippos, a prolific sculptor of Classical Greek art. The research and conservation of the Victorious Youth dates from the 1980s to the 1990s and is based on studies in classical bronzes by ancient Mediterranean specialists in collaboration with the Getty Museum.

The entire sculpture was cast in one piece through a casting technique called the lost wax method: the sculpture was first created in clay with support to allow hot air to melt the wax, creating a mold for molten bronze to be poured into and making the large bronze Victorious Youth.

More recently, scholars have been concerned with the original social context, such as where the sculpture was made, for what context and who the subject might be. Multiple interpretations of where the Youth was made and who the Youth is are expressed in scholarly books by Jiri Frel, J Paul Getty Museum curator from 1973 to 1986, and Carol Mattusch, professor of art history at George Mason University specializing in Greek and Roman art with a focus on classical bronzes.

== Description ==
The sculpture may have been part of the crowd of sculptures of victorious athletes at Panhellenic Greek sanctuaries like Delphi and Olympia. Analysis of fibres from the core revealed that they are flax; Pausanias noted in the second century CE that the only flax being grown in Greece was to be found around Olympia. Other research has developed an argument that the Bronze represents a victorious athlete and a young prince whose lineage relates to Alexander the Great. Therefore, this Olympic statue might have been dedicated anywhere within the ancient Greek world rather than Delphi or Olympia.

A possible reconstruction of the Victorious Youth is that the statue could have held a palm frond, as these were gifts given to the victors. His right hand reaches to touch the winner's olive wreath on his head. The powerful head has led the Victorious Youth conservators to see it as a portrait; X-rays suggest that the head was cast separately. With this technique the artist is able to focus on the head as an individual project to the full composition of the lithe body. The athlete's eyes were once inlaid, probably with bone, and his nipples are in contrasting copper. In addition to the wreath, the statue's build gives clues as to the subject: this individual is a slender young man with a confident gaze, but nothing about him refers to strength; his body is not particularly muscular or powerful in its stance.

== Techniques ==
=== The lost wax process ===
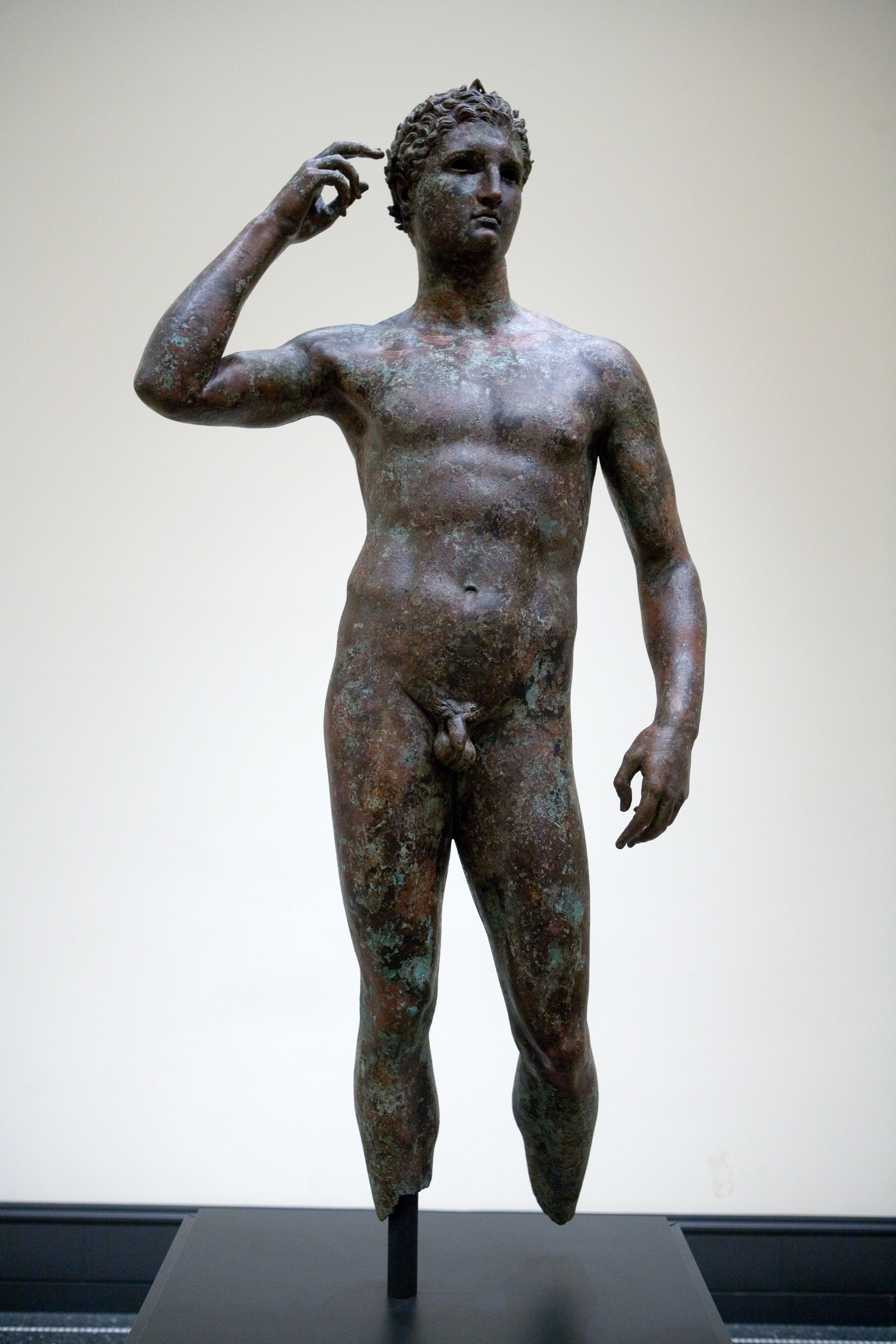
The bronze Victorious Youth at the Getty Museum. Height: 1.52 metres (5 feet) without lower legs and feet.

Like many other Greek artworks, the bronze statue was made through the lost wax method. Initially, the artist created an armature or support made with a thick wooden stick, iron bars or wires, and ancient reed sticks to support appendages from the torso. Surrounding the armature was a mixture of loam, sand, pebbles, pistachio nuts, fragments of clay and ivory, and glue. This combination kept the structure stable through multiple layers of application. After the final layer of clay was applied, wax sheets covered the statue's surface. During this process wax plates supported the figure from multiple points holding the statue vertically. Nails pierced into the wax to the inner core and protruded outwards to keep the statue positioned with the external mold. Slow heating allowed the wax to melt and fired the center and mold into a stable position. As the wax melted, an air space formed, creating a mold of the Victorious Youth, which became filled with molten bronze. The entire sculpture was cast in one piece.

=== Polychromy ===
Evidence of polychrome survives; the nipples are copper. This color choice may have interacted with the golden yellow of the bronze surface. There is a possibility of silver on the olive crown and more color to enhance the cheeks. The inserted eyes would have given the bronze statue a naturalistic look. During the casting process of the Youth, these eye sockets would have been left empty and after the casting process both eyes would be inserted. The iris and pupil would be made of stone or glass; the whites of the eyes would be ivory, bone or glass. To hold the eye in place a reddish sheet of copper would have been cut to fit the eye socket and then be curled into lashes. In addition to the application of bone, copper, glass, ivory, the bronze would be painted pale and gleaming like flesh to its viewers of the ancient world.

== Attribution ==
In the late 1980s antiquity scholars and Getty Museum curator Jiří Frel used radiocarbon dating and stylistic analysis to attribute the Youth to Lysippos. Using Polykleitos's statues as a comparison, scholars see a change from Polykleitan Kanon: the proportions become more subtle and richer in detail. There is a shift from the squareness in the face and innovative applications of elongation in the details of face and body. Lysippos was praised for his ability to evoke the soul from his statues through fleeting expressions. Establishing an exact artist for the work is challenging due to the lack of original Greek bronzes to use for comparison. Ancient literature gives testimony of the classical sculptors; however, the artist did not sign the statues. There is no physical evidence to support the conclusion that Lysippos was the sculptor, but Frel, Mattusch, and ancient literary source Pliny theorize that Lysippos or his student was the Youth's creator. In Pliny's Natural History, he includes information about Greek sculptors extracted from earlier texts that are lost to us. During the fourth century BCE, Lysippos produced a multitude of sculptures; he alone probably sculpted fifteen hundred statues. He came from a family of bronze workers who developed a new method of increasing production, and statues of athletes were a specialty.

== Dating ==
=== Origin ===
In 1974, Jerry Podany, antiquities conservator at the Getty Museum, and Marie Svoboda, a post-graduate intern in antiquities conservation at the Museum, radiocarbon-dated a piece of wood that came from the statue's core, establishing the bronze as an ancient piece of work. Over one month, conservator Rudolph Stapp removed the core of the bronze to eliminate issues related to humidity. During the removal, thermoluminescence dating and carbon-14 methods confirmed the dating of the Victorious Youth to pre-Roman times. The rectangular plate on the statue's back of neck functioned as support for the Bronze's vertical position, a technique shared by two other fourth-century bronzes: the Marathon Boy and the Antikythera Youth. The curved body, raised hip, and smooth and youthful anatomy are characteristics of a universal style—the fifth century BCE developed these frameworks as a canonical expression of classical values. This form of expression went on through two and a half millennia, making dating and attribution challenging to determine with confidence. Despite slightly different interpretations, a collective agreement states that production can be dated to between the late fourth century and middle of the third century BCE.

=== Collectors in antiquity ===
Many statues from Greek cities and sanctuaries moved into Roman possession by the second century BCE. Vast collections of the antique style flourished, various statuary were looted and repurposed for Roman decoration. Like many other bronzes, the Victorious Youth traveled across the Mediterranean on its way to Italy for reinstallation, possibly in public areas or in private homes.

== Interpretation ==
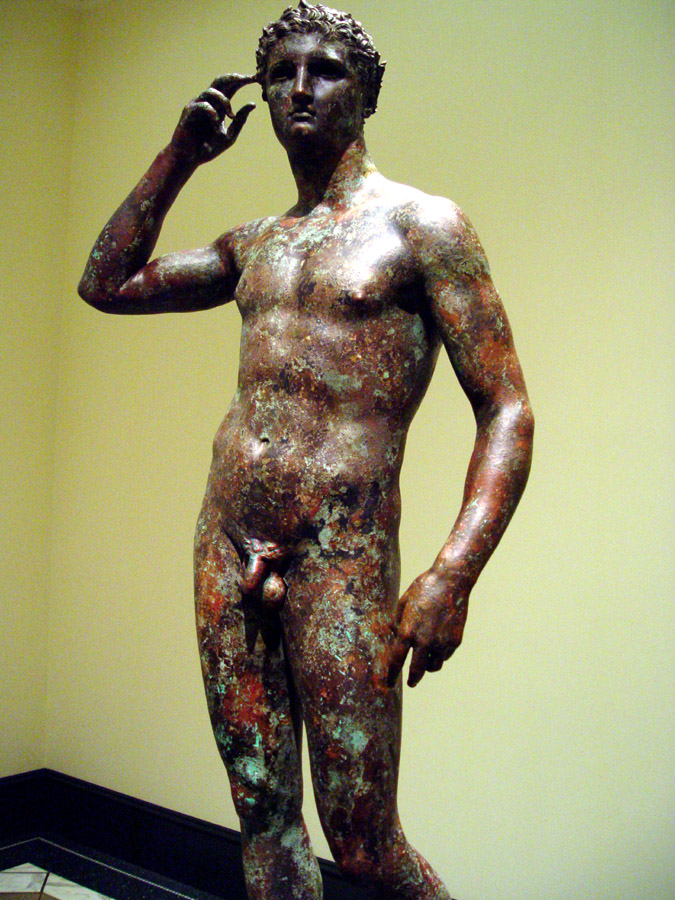
Victorious Youth

According to Jiri Frel, the stance and proportion of the "Getty Bronze" (Frel's name for the statue) are similar to those of Lysippos's portrait of Demetrios Poliorketes (336–283 BCE). The least controversial theory is that the strong calves emphasize his athletic abilities, making him an Olympic runner who held a victor's palm branch in his left arm. Claims state there are actual traces of palm after studying the statue. Interpreting the anatomy is important in identifying the statue, from the detail in the joints, delicate attention to the wrists and ends of fingers there is a youthful representation. Greek games functioned as a major aspect in Greek culture and art. During the second century CE, athletic contests were consistent events in various cities throughout Greece. At Olympia, these games were categorized for men, youths and boys. The Panhellenic Games occurred at religious sanctuaries in honor of the gods; Delphi hosted Pythian games as gifts for Apollo and athletic events at Olympia honored Zeus. These games included footraces, combat sports, pentathlon, horse racing, and chariot racing. Delphi involved singing and playing of instruments in these Panhellenic Games. The victors received wreaths of different leaves depending on the site location: laurel at Delphi, olive at Olympia, pine at Isthmia, and wild celery at Nemea. By understanding the specific wreaths worn by the winners, one could hypothesize which temple the statue would have housed.

Jiri Frel in 1982 examined the statue and associated it with Alexander the Great, based on the stance and other features representing not just a well-bred citizen but one higher in class. The artist's ability to not only capture beauty but produce a work of art that emphasizes the classical structures of Greek art during the Hellenistic period suggests the Youth as a member of one of the royal families descended from Alexander. However, this theory did not survive the criticism of other scholars. Not until the 1990s was the next attempt made to identify the sculpture, and the Getty Museum did not approve the suggested name. Now much debate and research is specific to anatomy, date and authorship, but with the uncertainties of stylistic assessments it is difficult to reach a consensus.

== Discovery ==
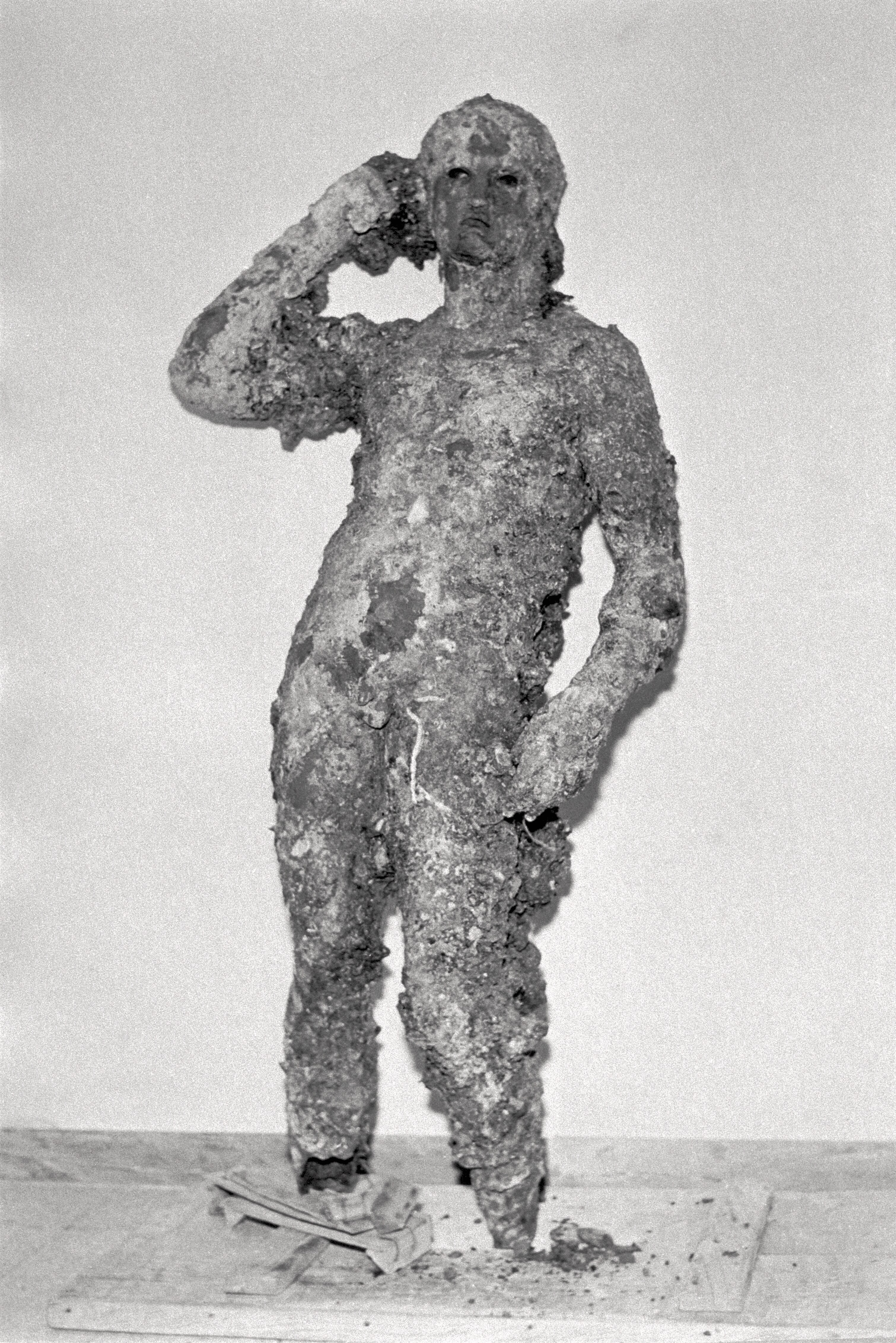
The Victorious Youth before restoration

Classical Greek and Roman sculptures have been found in various parts of the Mediterranean; both Greek and Roman settlements existed in the Iberian Peninsula, on Africa's northern coast, in Asia Minor, the Middle East, and modern-day Europe. Many underwater bronzes have been discovered along the Aegean and Mediterranean coasts. Sponge divers found the Antikythera Youth and the Portrait Head of a Stoic at Antikythera in 1900. Other well-known underwater bronze finds include those from the Mahdia shipwreck off the coast of Tunisia, 1907; the Marathon Boy off the coast of Marathon, 1925; the standing Artemision Bronze of Zeus or Poseidon found off Cape Artemision in northern Euboea, 1926; the Jockey of Artemision found off Cape Artemision, 1928 and 1937; the Riace bronzes, 1972; the Dancing Satyr of Mazara del Vallo near Brindisi, 1992; and the Apoxyomenos off the Croatian island of Lošinj, 1999.

The Victorious Youth was found in the summer of 1964 in the sea off Fano on the Adriatic coast of Italy, snagged in the nets of an Italian fishing trawler, the Ferri Ferruccio. Italian art dealers paid the fishermen US$5,600 for it. The Getty Museum bought it from German art dealer Herman Heinz Herzer for almost US$4 million in 1977. Before conservation, a thick layer of encrustation covered the statue, suggesting it has been immersed since antiquity, rather than as a result of medieval or late Venetian ships transporting the object as spoils of war or recycling it for scrap metal.

The precise location of the shipwreck, which preserved this object from being melted down like all but a tiny fraction of Greek bronzes, has not been established; it seems most likely that a Roman ship carrying looted objects was on its way to Italy when it sank. The statue has been roughly broken off its former base, breaking away at the ankles. The clay core inside may give further detail to where and when it was made.

== Restoration ==
In 1972 Heinz Herzer and Volker Kinnius, the Munich gallery owner, wrote a report on the conservation project of Rudolph Stapp. Stapp, known for his specialty in ancient bronzes, was the main conservationist working on the Victorious Youth. Past efforts to remove encrustation from the Bronze left scratches in the metal. The Victorious Youth took three months to clean. First, the statue went into an artificial humidity chamber, exposing 'bronze disease'. This degradation occurs when chlorides and salts in the bronze react with moisture, producing discolored spots. If the condition is left untreated, the copper part of the bronze can easily be lost, leaving a disfigured image. The conservators neutralized the active corrosion by submerging it in a heated solution of sodium sesquicarbonate. The Victorious Youth was then placed in a vacuum with the solution to penetrate interior layers without washing anything out. This process was repeated twice and was finalized with one last artificial humidity test to check for bronze disease resurfacing. An environment with a relative humidity under 35% is necessary to keep the statue from deteriorating.

== Provenance ==
After the bronze was retrieved in 1964 it was brought to land in Italy, where it reportedly passed through several hands on the black market. It emerged in 1971 under the ownership of the Artemis Consortium, an association of several international art dealers, and was then stored with a Munich art dealer, Heinz Herzer.

The Getty Museum is involved in a controversy regarding proper title to a number of the artwork in its collection. The Museum's previous curator of antiquities, Marion True, was indicted in Italy in 2005 along with Robert E. Hecht on criminal charges relating to trafficking in stolen antiquities. The primary evidence in the case came from the 1995 raid of a Geneva, Switzerland warehouse that was found to contain stolen artifacts. Italian art dealer Giacomo Medici was eventually arrested in 1997; his operation was reported to be "one of the largest and most sophisticated antiquities networks in the world, responsible for illegally digging up and spiriting away thousands of top-drawer pieces and passing them on to the most elite end of the international art market". In a letter to the J. Paul Getty Trust on December 18, 2006, True stated that she was being made to "carry the burden" for practices that were known, approved, and condoned by the Getty's Board of Directors.

On November 20, 2006, the Director of the museum, Michael Brand, announced that 26 disputed pieces were to be returned to Italy. These did not include the Victorious Youth, for which judicial proceedings were still pending. In an interview to the Italian national newspaper Corriere della Sera on December 20, 2006, the Italian Minister of Cultural Heritage declared that Italy would place the museum under a cultural embargo if all the 52 disputed pieces did not return to Italy. On August 1, 2007, an agreement was announced providing that the museum would return 40 pieces to Italy out of the 52 requested, among them the Venus of Morgantina, which was returned in 2010, but not the Victorious Youth, whose outcome depended upon the results of the criminal proceedings in Italy. On that same day the public prosecutor of Pesaro formally requested that the statue be confiscated as it was unlawfully exported out of Italy, giving rise to a dispute that came before the Constitutional Court.

Among the arguments the Getty advanced for retaining the sculpture were that, although the sculpture was retrieved by an Italian vessel, it was found in international, not Italian, waters and that it is not the work of an Italian but a Greek artist. However, on November 30, 2018, the Supreme Court of Cassation denied an appeal by the Getty Museum, affirming that Italy has a right to reclaim the Victorious Youth. On May 2, 2024, the European Court of Human Rights affirmed the ruling of Italy's Supreme Court of Cassation.

== See also ==
- Antikythera Ephebe
- Lysippos
- Fano

== General references ==
- Frel, Jiri, 1978. The Getty Bronze (Malibu: The J. Paul Getty Museum).
- Antonietta Viacava, L' atleta di Fano, edizioni L'Erma di Bretschneider, 1995, ISBN 88-7062-868-X.
- Mattusch, Carol C. 1997. The Victorious Youth (Getty Museum Studies on Art; Los Angeles: The J. Paul Getty Museum). Reviewed in Bryn Mawr Classical Review
