= Dancing Satyr of Mazara del Vallo =

Greek bronze statue

Coordinates: 37°39′07″N 12°35′18″E

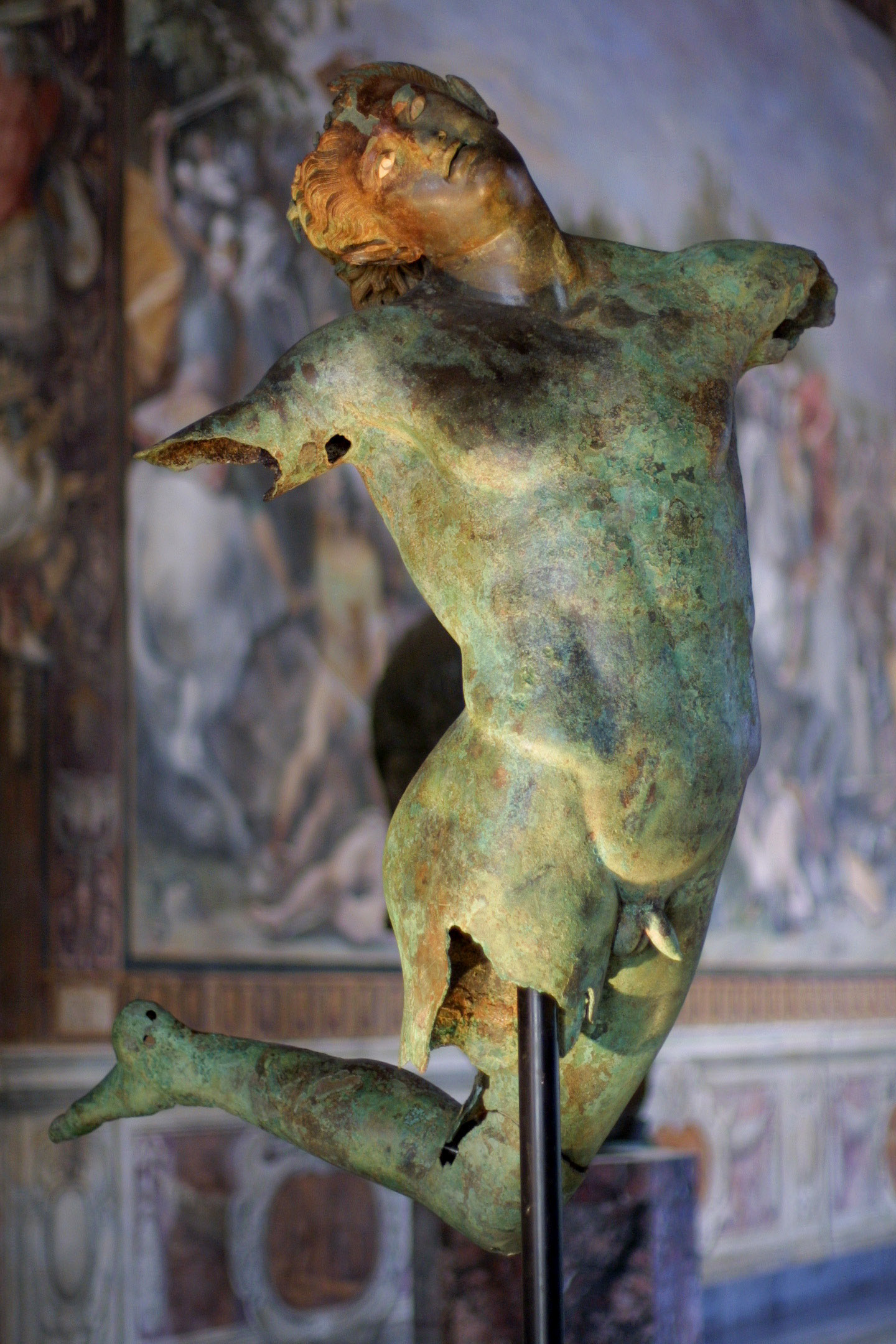
- Material: Bronze
- Height: 2.4 meters (original); 2 meters
- Discovered: 4 March 1998; Mediterranean Sea
- Present location: Mazara del Vallo, Sicily, Italy

The Dancing Satyr of Mazara del Vallo is a fragmentary over-lifesize ancient Greek bronze statue, of Magna Graecia whose refinement and rapprochement with the manner of Praxiteles has made it a subject of discussion. It is an example of a dancing satyr, a sculptural archetype in Hellenistic and Roman art. Another well-known example is the Faun from the House of the Faun, Pompeii.

In its present state it is 2 meters high (6 ft 6 in); originally it would have been about 2.4 meters (7 ft 10 in).

It was recovered from the sea floor off Sicily in 1998, and is now on display in the church of Sant'Egidio, Mazara del Vallo, Sicily. Though some have dated it to the 4th century BCE and said it was an original work by Praxiteles or a faithful copy, it is more securely dated either to the Hellenistic period of the 3rd and 2nd centuries BCE, or possibly to the Roman "Atticising" phase in the early 2nd century CE.

== Style and details ==
Though the satyr is missing both arms, one leg, and its separately-cast tail (originally fixed in a surviving hole at the base of the spine), its head and torso are remarkably well-preserved despite two millennia spent at the bottom of the sea. The satyr is depicted in mid-leap, head thrown back ecstatically and back arched, his hair swinging with the movement of his head. The facture is highly refined; the whites of his eyes are alabaster inlays.

A high percentage of lead in the bronze alloy suggests its being made in Rome itself.

== Rediscovery and display ==
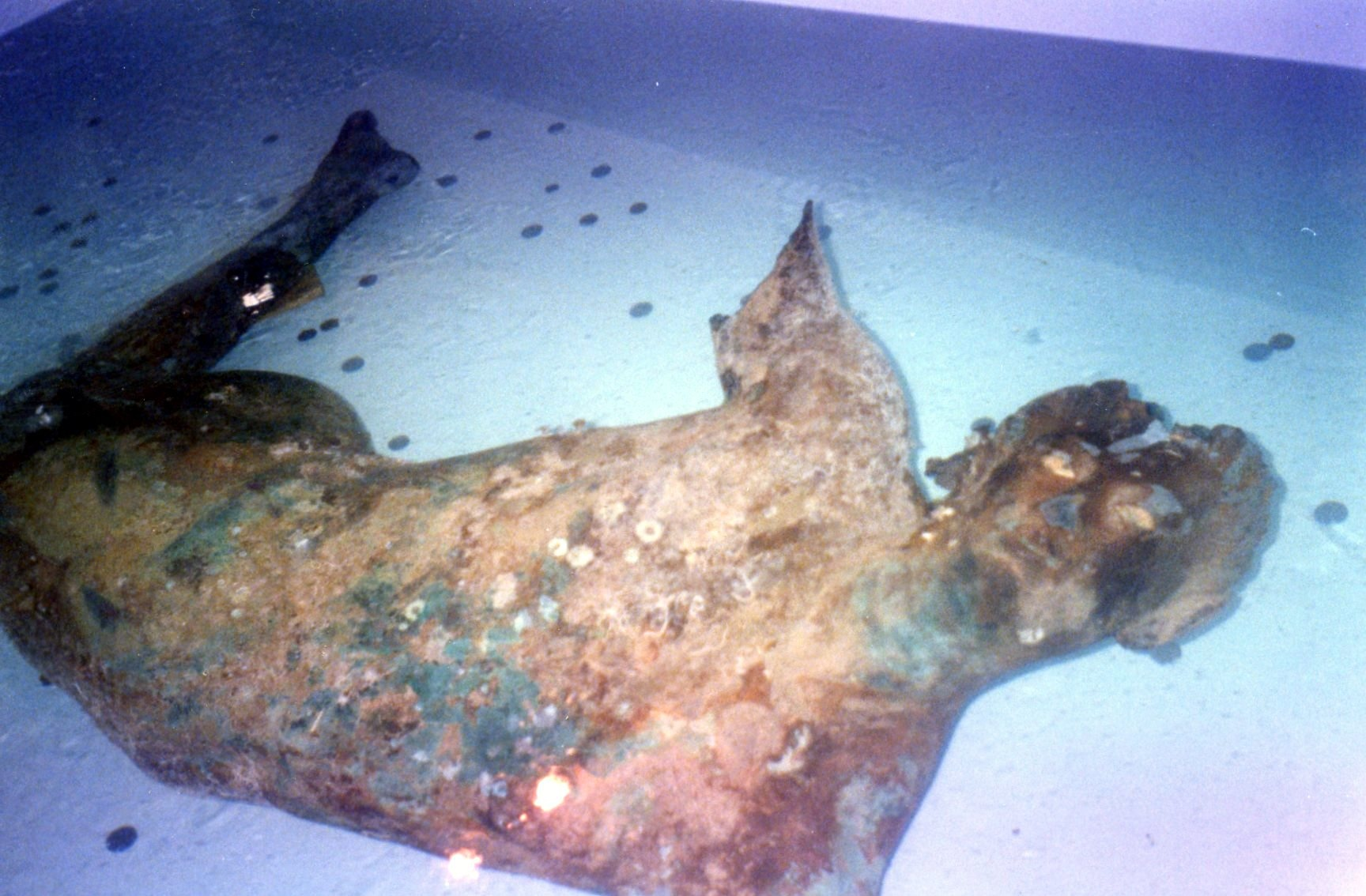
The Dancing Satyr soon after its recovery, 1998

The torso was recovered from the sandy sea floor at a depth of 500 metres (1,600 ft) off the southwestern coast of Sicily, on the night of March 4, 1998, in the nets of the same fishing boat (operating from Mazara del Vallo, hence the sculpture's name) that had in the previous year recovered the sculpture's left leg.

Other well-known underwater finds of Greek bronzes have been retrieved from the Aegean and Mediterranean seas, generally from shipwreck sites: the Antikythera mechanism, the Antikythera Ephebe and the portrait head of a Stoic discovered by sponge-divers at Antikythera in 1900, the Mahdia shipwreck off the coast of Tunisia, 1907; the Marathon Boy off the coast of Marathon, 1925; the standing Poseidon of Cape Artemision found off Cape Artemision in northern Euboea, 1926; the horse and Rider found off Cape Artemision, 1928 and 1937; the Getty Victorious Youth found off Fano on the Adriatic coast of Italy; the Riace bronzes, found in 1972; and the Apoxyomenos recovered from the sea off the Croatian island of Lošinj in 1999.

Restoration at the Istituto Centrale per il Restauro, Rome, included a steel armature so that the statue can be displayed upright. When first displayed to the public after conservation (in the Chamber of Deputies in Rome, from 31 March to 2 June 2003), it was hailed as the finest new discovery in Italian waters since the Riace bronzes were found in 1972. On 12 July 2003 it returned to Mazara del Vallo, where it is on permanent display in the Museo del Satiro in the church of Sant'Egidio. There, it is provided with an anti-seismic base, to secure it against tremors in this earthquake zone. From 23 March to 28 June 2007 it toured to the Louvre for their Praxiteles exhibition, and an associated Louvre interactive installation, "Connaître la forme" ("Know your form"), displayed a replica of it lit in various ways to demonstrate the importance of lighting in displaying a sculpture.

== See also ==
- Hellenistic Greece
