= Marathon Boy =

Greek bronze sculpture

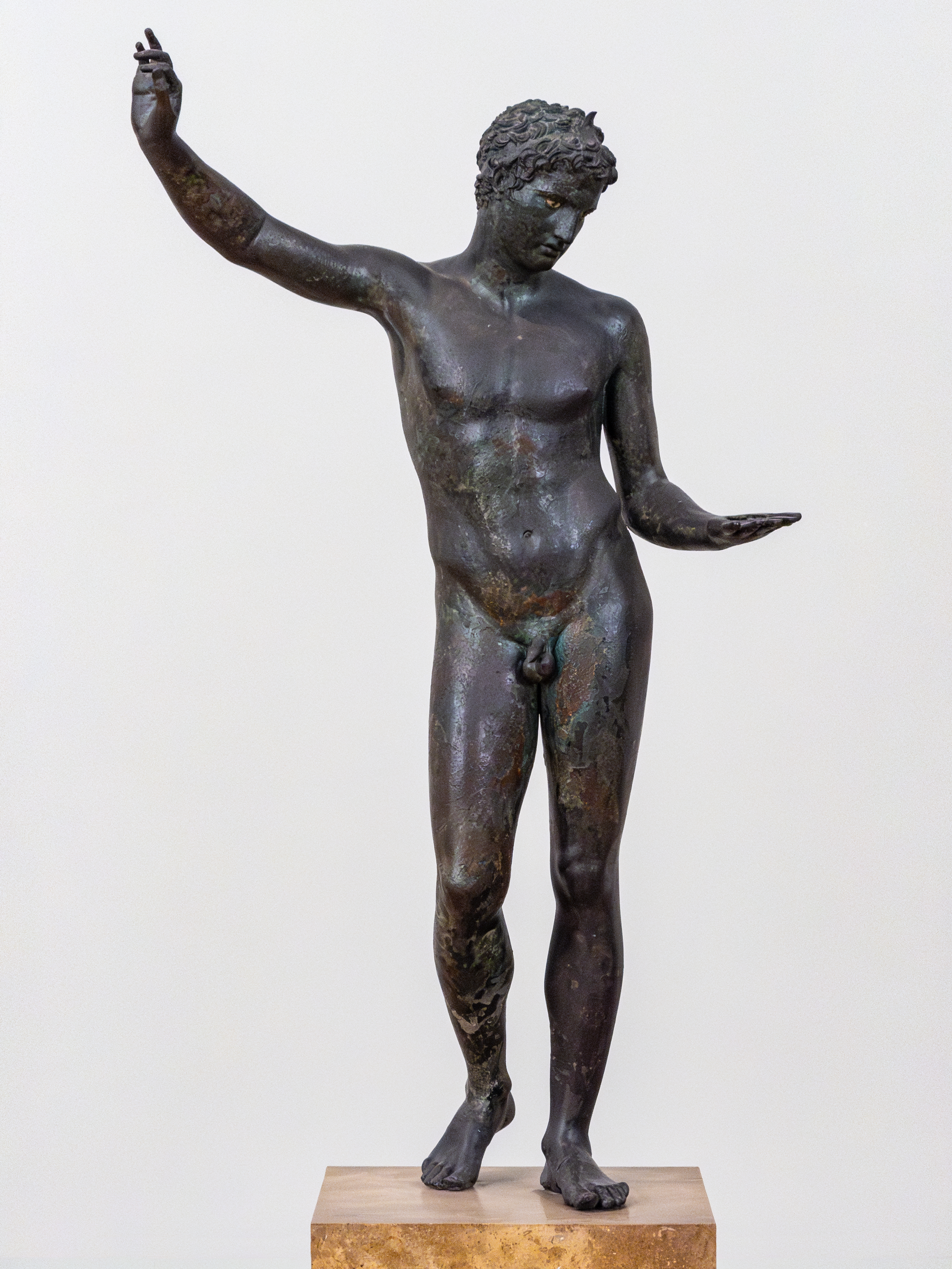
- Material: Bronze
- Height: 1.3 meters
- Created: 340 – 330 BC
- Discovered: June 1925; Aegean Sea
- Present location: Athens, Attica, Greece

The Marathon Boy or Ephebe of Marathon is a Greek bronze sculpture found in the Aegean Sea in the bay of Marathon in 1925.

The sculpture is conserved in the National Archaeological Museum of Athens where it is dated to around 340–330 BC. The Museum suggests that the subject is the winner of an athletic competition. With its soft musculature and exaggerated contrapposto, its style is associated with the school of Praxiteles. The upraised arm and the distribution of weight indicate that in his original context, this ephebe was leaning against a vertical support, such as a column.

== Other underwater finds ==
Before the advent of scuba diving, its chance recovery suggested the possibility that artistic as well as archaeological treasures had been preserved from human destruction in underwater sites. Other well-known underwater bronze finds have been retrieved, generally from shipwreck sites, in the Aegean and Mediterranean: the Antikythera mechanism, the Antikythera Ephebe and the portrait head of a Stoic discovered by sponge-divers in 1900, the Mahdia shipwreck off the coast of Tunisia, 1907; the standing Poseidon of Cape Artemision found off Cape Artemision in northern Euboea, 1926; the horse and Rider found off Cape Artemision, 1928 and 1937; the Getty Victorious Youth dredged up off the coast of Fano, Italy; the Riace bronzes, found in 1972; the Dancing Satyr of Mazara del Vallo, in the Sicily Channel, 2003; and the Apoxyomenos recovered from the sea off the Croatian island of Lošinj in 1999.

== Gallery ==
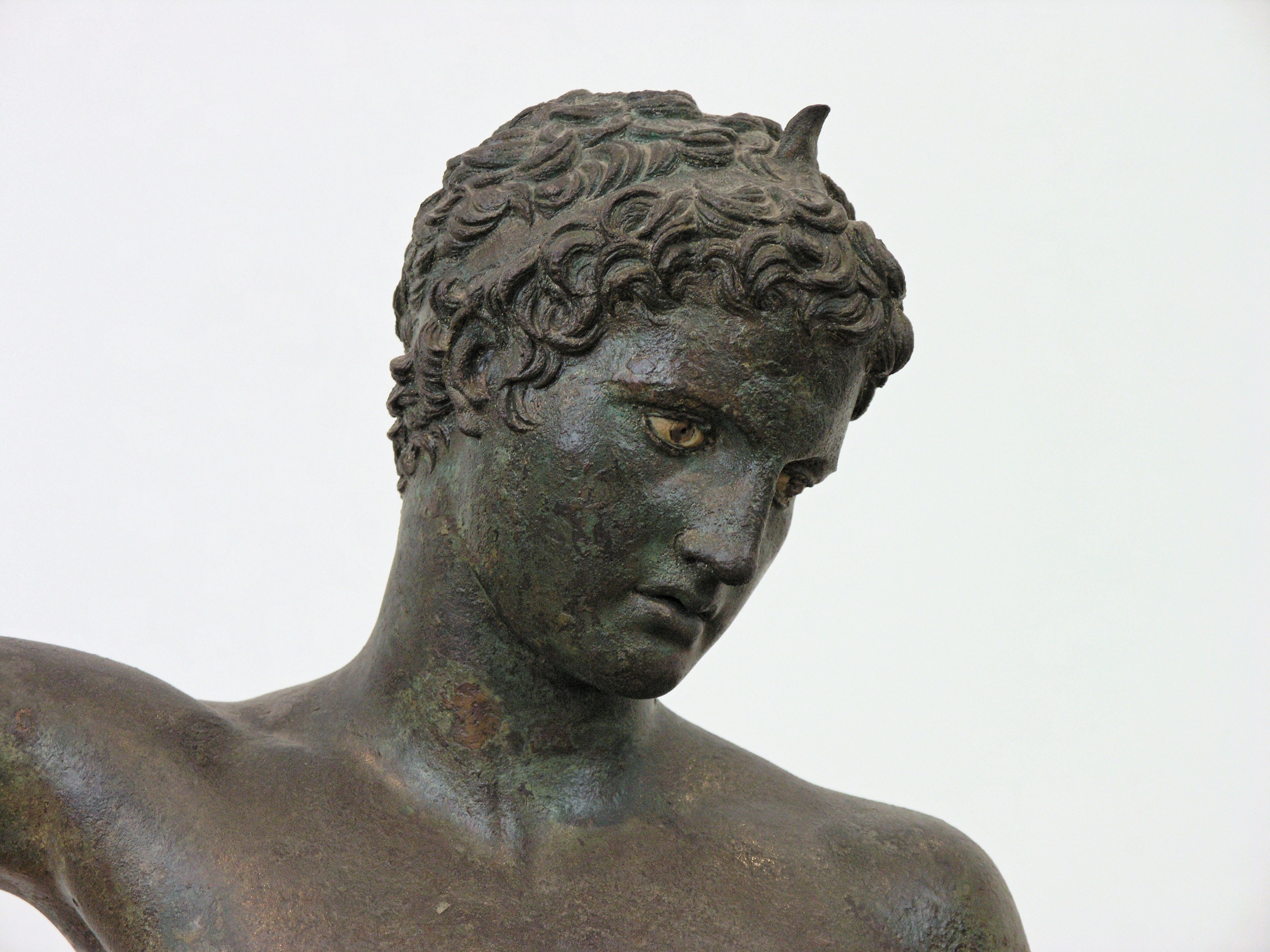

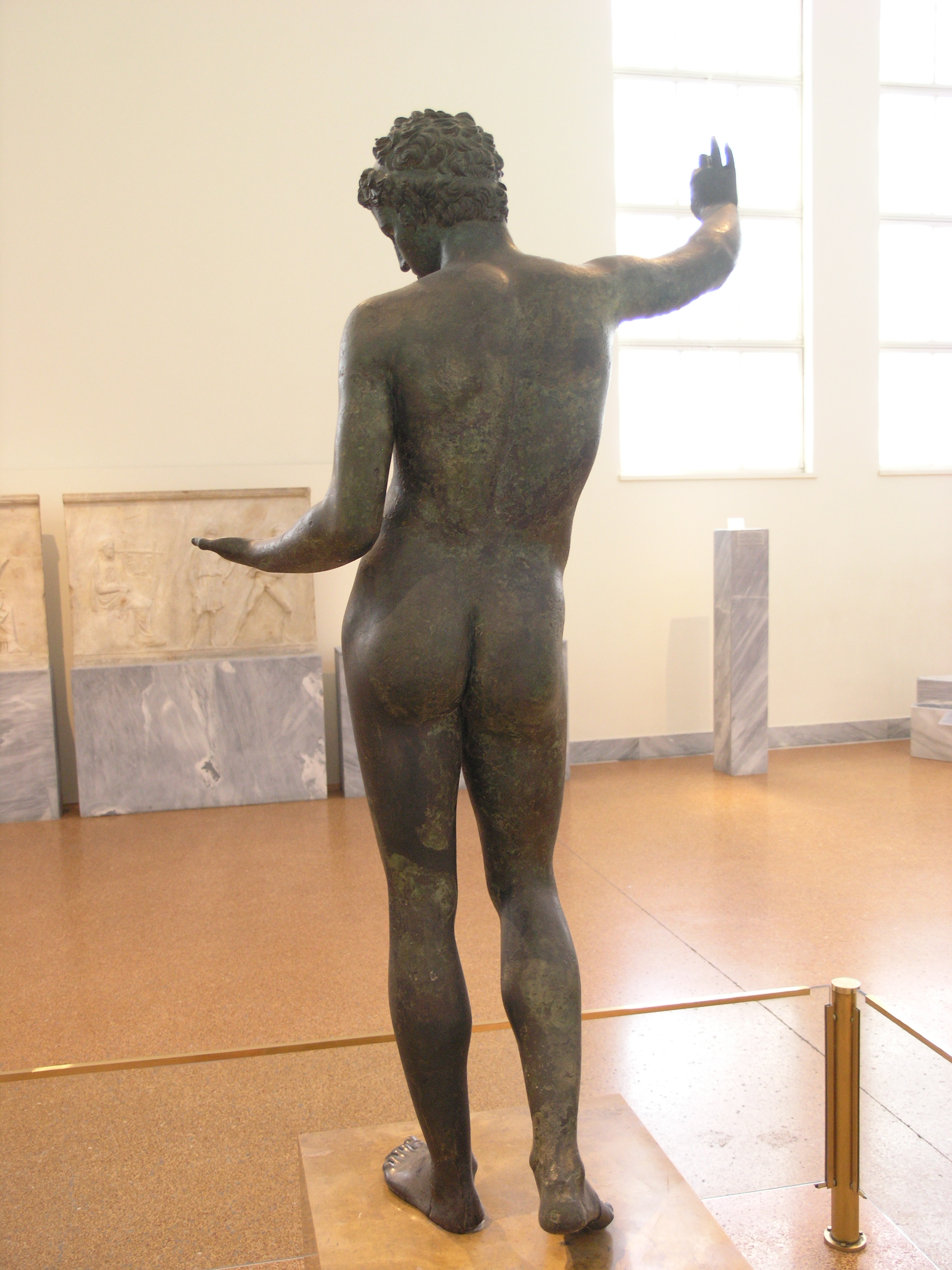

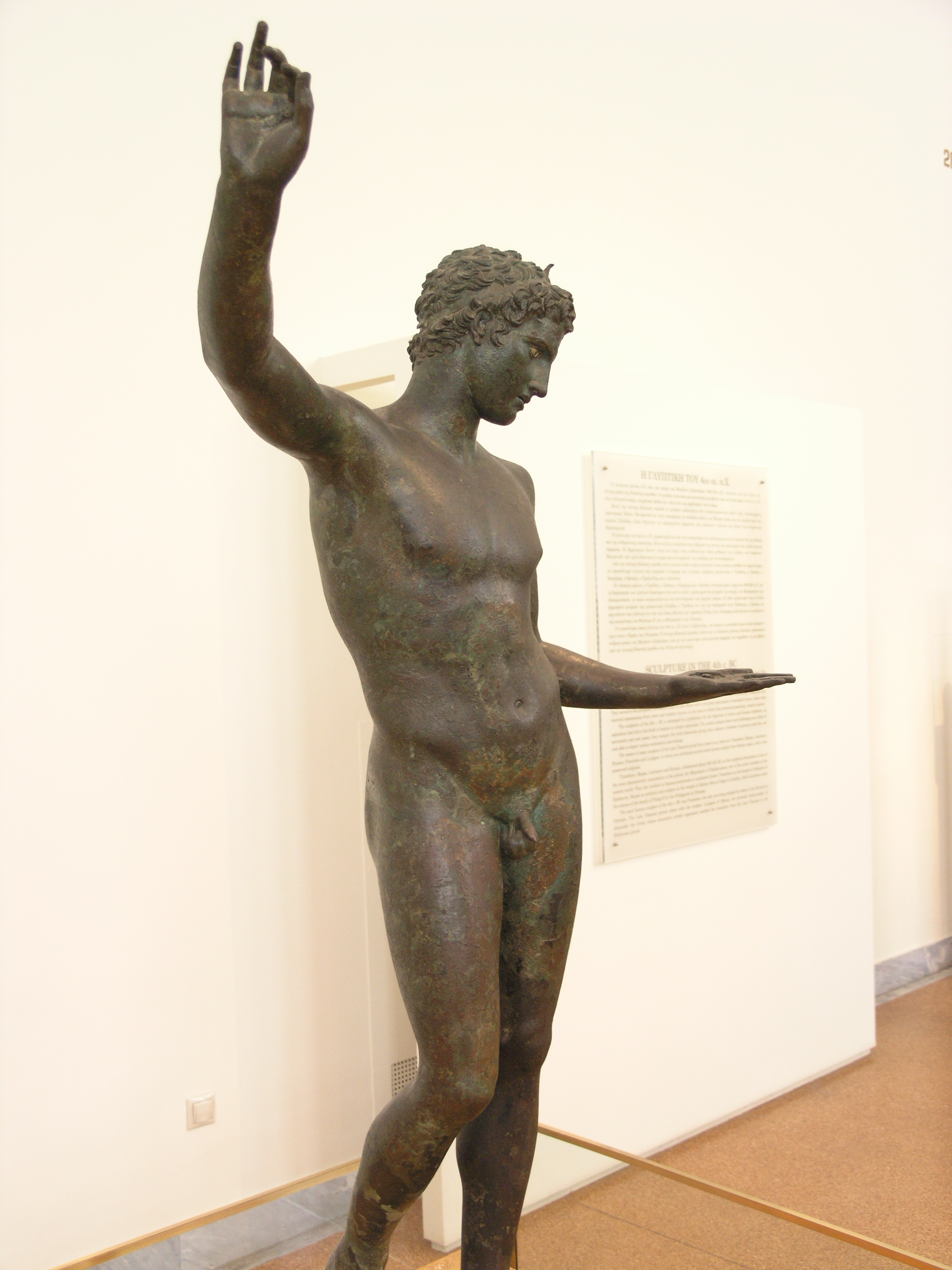

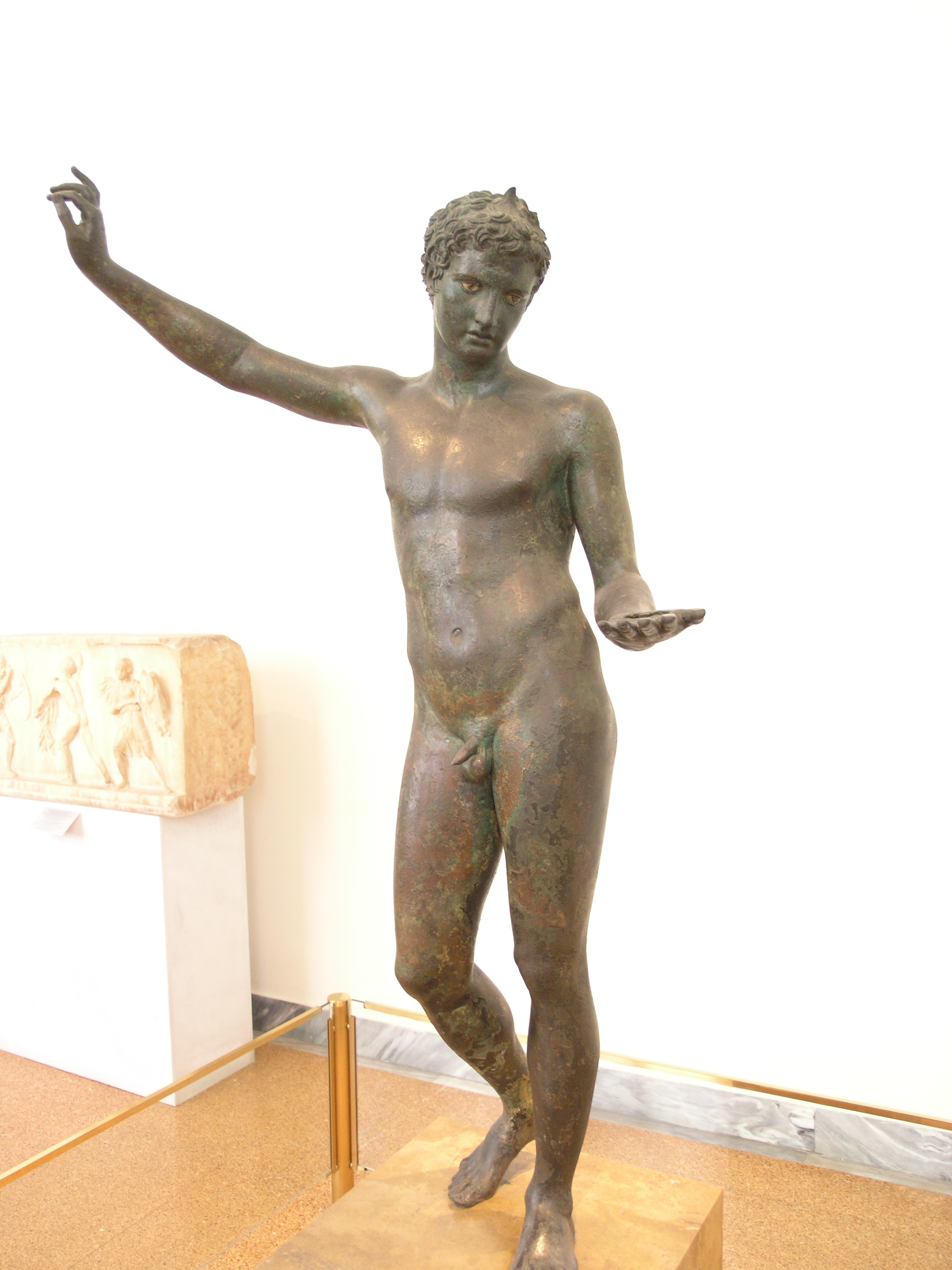
