= Alfred Merlin =

French historian and archaeologist (1876–1965)

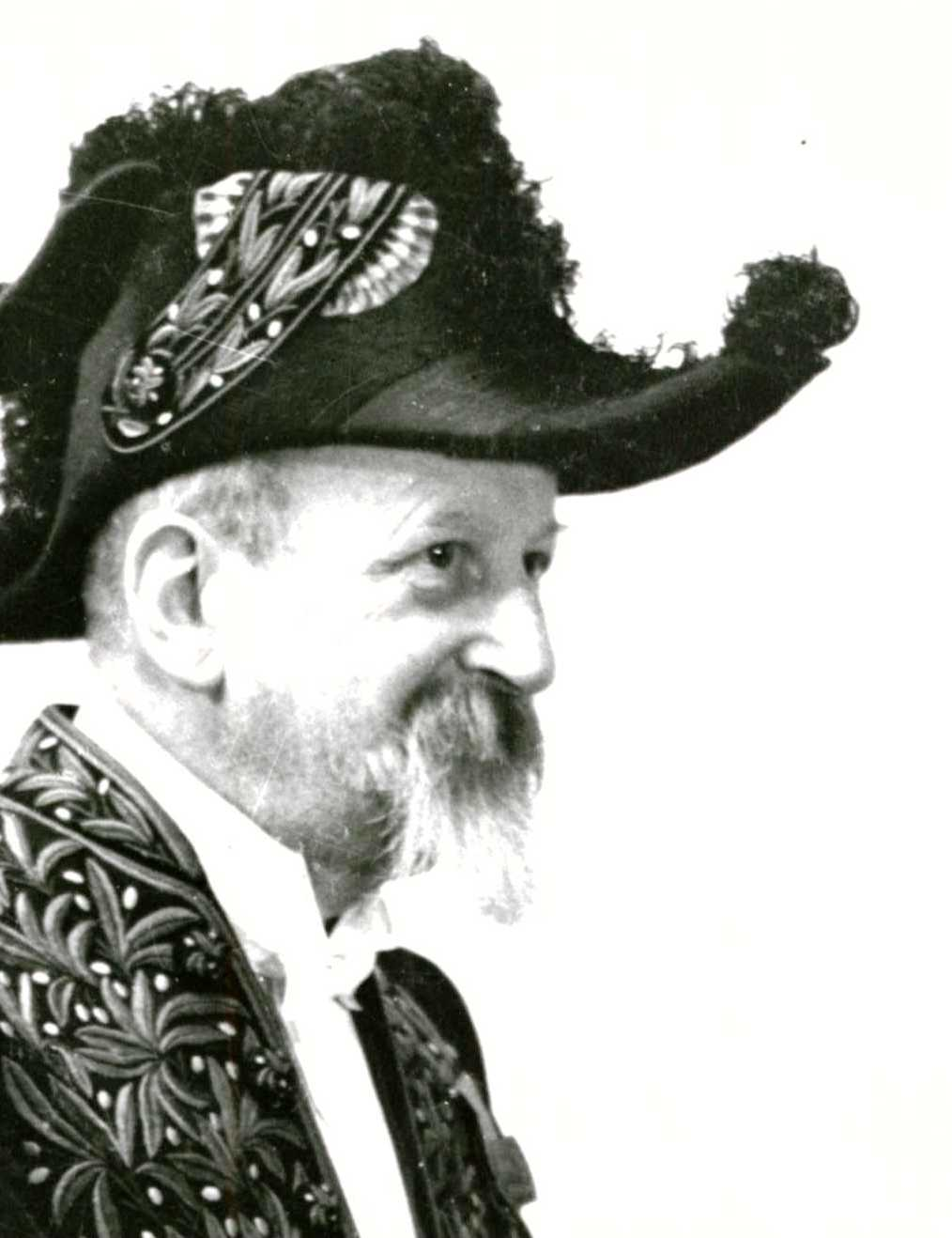
- Alfred Merlin in his academician's outfit (circa 1937).
- Born: 13 March 1876; Orléans
- Died: 16 March 1965 (aged 89); Neuilly-sur-Seine
- Occupations: Historian; Archaeologist; Numismatist; Epigrapher

Alfred Merlin (13 March 1876, in Orléans – 16 March 1965, in Neuilly-sur-Seine) was a 20th-century French historian, archaeologist, pioneer and founder of underwater archaeology, a numismatist and epigrapher.

== Biography ==
After his studies at the École Normale Supérieure, he obtained the agrégation in history and geography in 1900, then left for the École française de Rome (1901–1903). He then held the position of director of the Antiquities Service in Tunisia between 1906 and 1920, during which he was one of the pioneers of the exploration of the archaeological site of Dougga between 1901 and 1902.

In 1907, he was alerted by Greek sponge fishermen cruising between Sousse and Sfax to the existence of a cluster of columns mixed with debris of all kinds lying forty metres deep. Merlin then enlisted local maritime authorities and financial support to launch the first campaign of underwater archaeological excavation on the Mahdia shipwreck. He thus brought to the surface some Athenian art objects dating back to the first century B.C., including the famous Hermes bronze Dionysus, signed by the sculptor Boethus. Campaigns on the wreck by Merlon followed each other until 1913.

He then became curator and chief curator of Greek and Roman antiquities at the Louvre Museum from 1921 to 1946. In 1928, he was elected a member of the Académie des Inscriptions et Belles-Lettres, of which he was permanent secretary until 1964.

Alfred Merlin was the son in law of historian René Cagnat; his wife Renée died 2 March 1965 aged 89.

== Publications ==
The vast majority of works by Alfred Merlin consist of communications made to the Comité des travaux historiques et scientifiques :

- L'Aventin dans l'Antiquité, BEFR, fasc. 97, 1906;
- L'Année épigraphique (director).

== Sources and bibliography ==
- Pierre Boyancé, "Nécrologie : Alfred Merlin (1876-1965)", Mélanges d'archéologie et d'histoire, vol. 77, N° 77-2, 1965, (p. 641–642) (read online)
- Georges Tessier, "Notice sur la vie et les travaux de M. Alfred Merlin, Secrétaire perpétuel honoraire de l'Académie", CRAI, vol. 109, N° 2, 1965, (p. 482–494) (read online)
