= Ephebos =

Greek term for a male adolescent

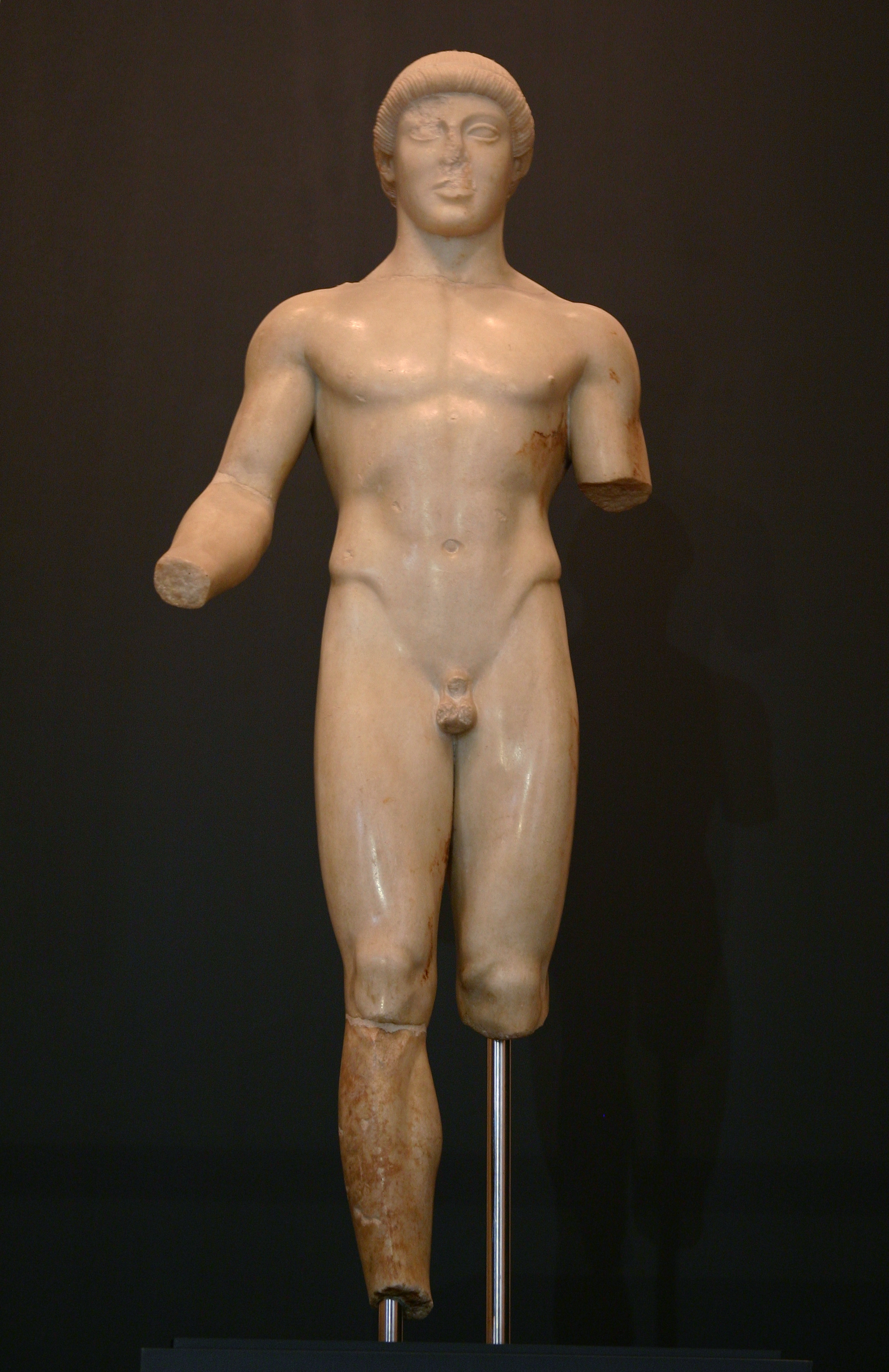
The Agrigento Ephebe, a severe-style Greek sculpture of the 5th century BC in the museum of Agrigento, Sicily

Ephebos (Greek: ἔφηβος; pl. epheboi, Greek: ἔφηβοι), latinized as ephebus (pl. ephebi) and anglicised as ephebe (pl. ephebes), is a term for a male adolescent in Ancient Greece. The term was particularly used to denote one who was doing military training and preparing to become an adult. From about 335 BC, ephebes from Athens (aged between 18 and 20) underwent two years of military training under supervision, during which time they were exempt from civic duties and deprived of most civic rights. During the 3rd century BC, ephebic service ceased to be compulsory and its timespan reduced to one year. By the 1st century BC, the ephebia became an institution reserved for wealthy individuals and, besides military training, it also included philosophic and literary studies.

Peripoli (περίπολοι) were troops assigned to patrol duty, the term was also used for Athenian ephebes during the two years of their ephebic training, and this phase of their service was known as peripolia (περιπολία).

== History ==
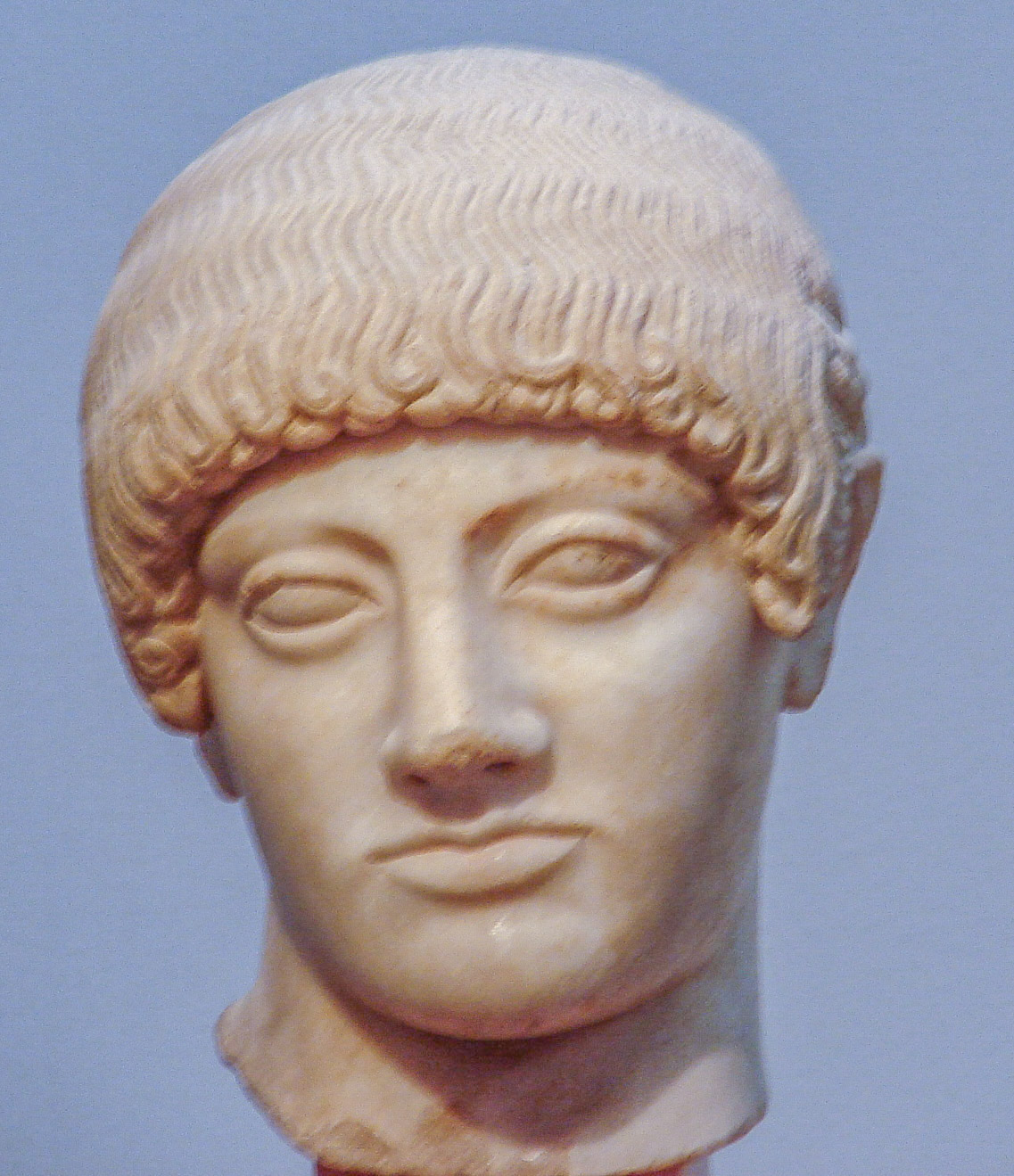
Blond Kouros's Head of the Acropolis museum in Athens

Though the word ephebos (from epi "upon" + hebe "youth", "early manhood") can simply refer to the adolescent age of young men of training age, its main use is for the members, exclusively from that age group, of an official institution (ephebia) that saw to building them into citizens, but especially to training them as soldiers, sometimes already sent into the field; the Greek city states (poleis) mainly depended (like the Roman Republic) on its militia of citizens for defense.

In the time of Aristotle (384–322 BC), Athens engraved the names of the enrolled ephebi on a bronze pillar (formerly on wooden tablets) in front of the council-chamber. After admission to the college, the ephebus took the oath of allegiance (as recorded in histories by Pollux and Stobaeus—but not in Aristotle) in the temple of Aglaurus and was sent to Munichia or Acte as a member of the garrison. At the end of the first year of training the ephebi were reviewed; if their performance was satisfactory, the state provided each with a spear and a shield, which, together with the chlamys (cloak) and petasos (broad-brimmed hat), made up their equipment. In their second year they were transferred to other garrisons in Attica, patrolled the frontiers, and on occasion took an active part in war. During these two years they remained free from taxation, and were generally not allowed to appear in the law courts as plaintiffs or defendants. The ephebi took part in some of the most important Athenian festivals. Thus during the Eleusinian Mysteries they were sent to fetch the sacred objects from Eleusis and to escort the image of Iacchus on the sacred way. They also performed police duty at the meetings of the ecclesia.

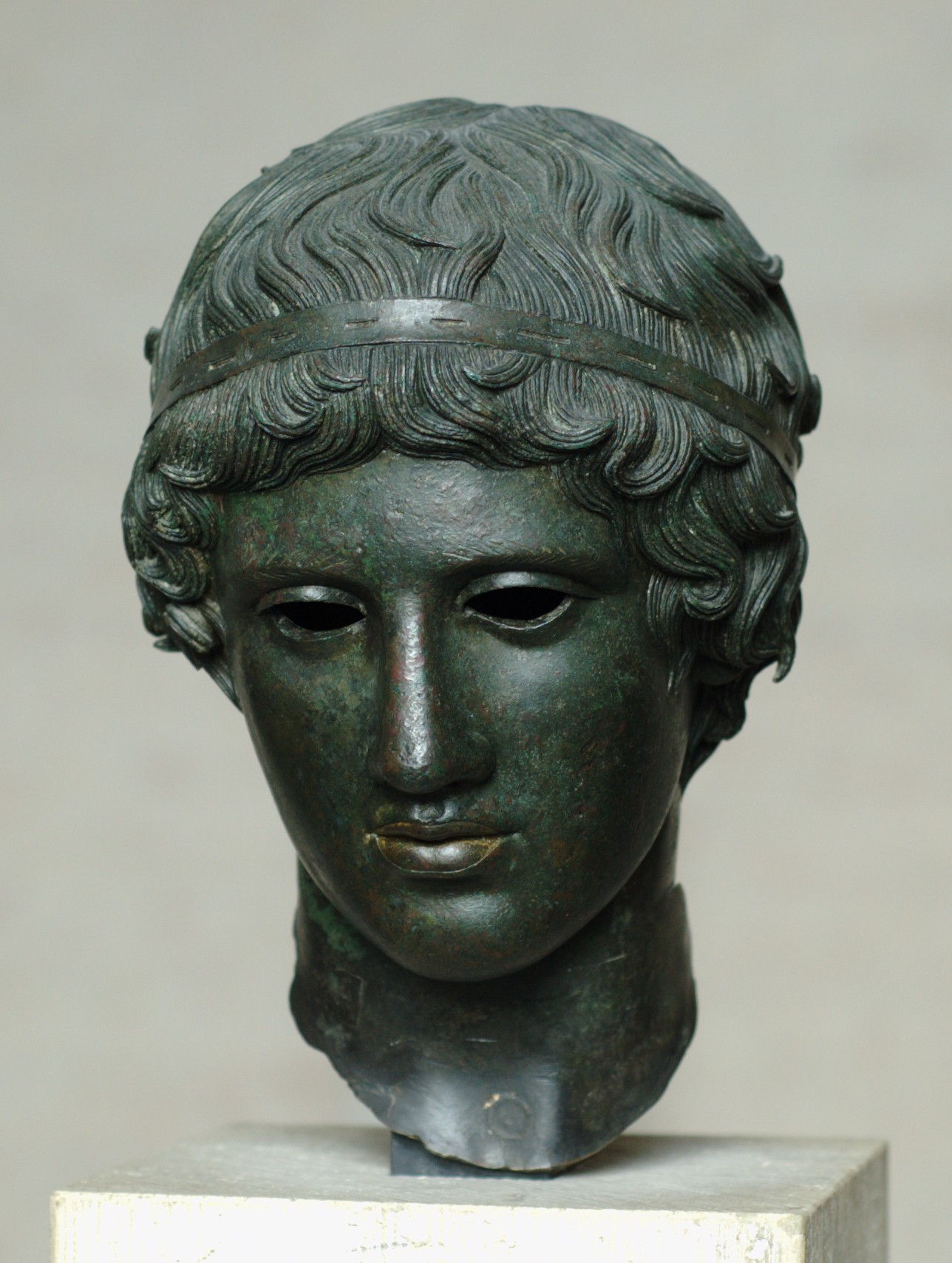
Bronze head of an ephebe wearing a winners binding. 1st century AD Roman copy

After the end of the 4th century BC, the institution underwent a radical change. Enrolment ceased to be obligatory, lasted only for a year, and the limit of age was dispensed with. Inscriptions attest a continually decreasing number of ephebi, and with the admission of foreigners the college lost its representative national character. This was mainly due to the weakening of the military spirit and to the progress of intellectual culture. The military element was no longer all-important, and the ephebia became a sort of university for well-to-do young men of good family, whose social position has been compared with that of the Athenian "knights" of earlier times. The institution lasted till the end of the 3rd century AD.

In the Hellenistic and Roman periods, foreigners, including Romans, began to be admitted as ephebes. At this period the college of ephebi was a miniature city, which possessed an archon, strategos, herald and other officials, after the model of the city of Athens.

== Sculpture ==
In Ancient Greek sculpture, an ephebe is a sculptural type depicting a nude ephebos (Archaic examples of the type are also often known as the kouros type, or kouroi in the plural). This typological name often occurs in the form "the X Ephebe", where X is the collection to which the object belongs or belonged, or the site on which it was found (e.g. the Agrigento Ephebe).

== Gallery ==
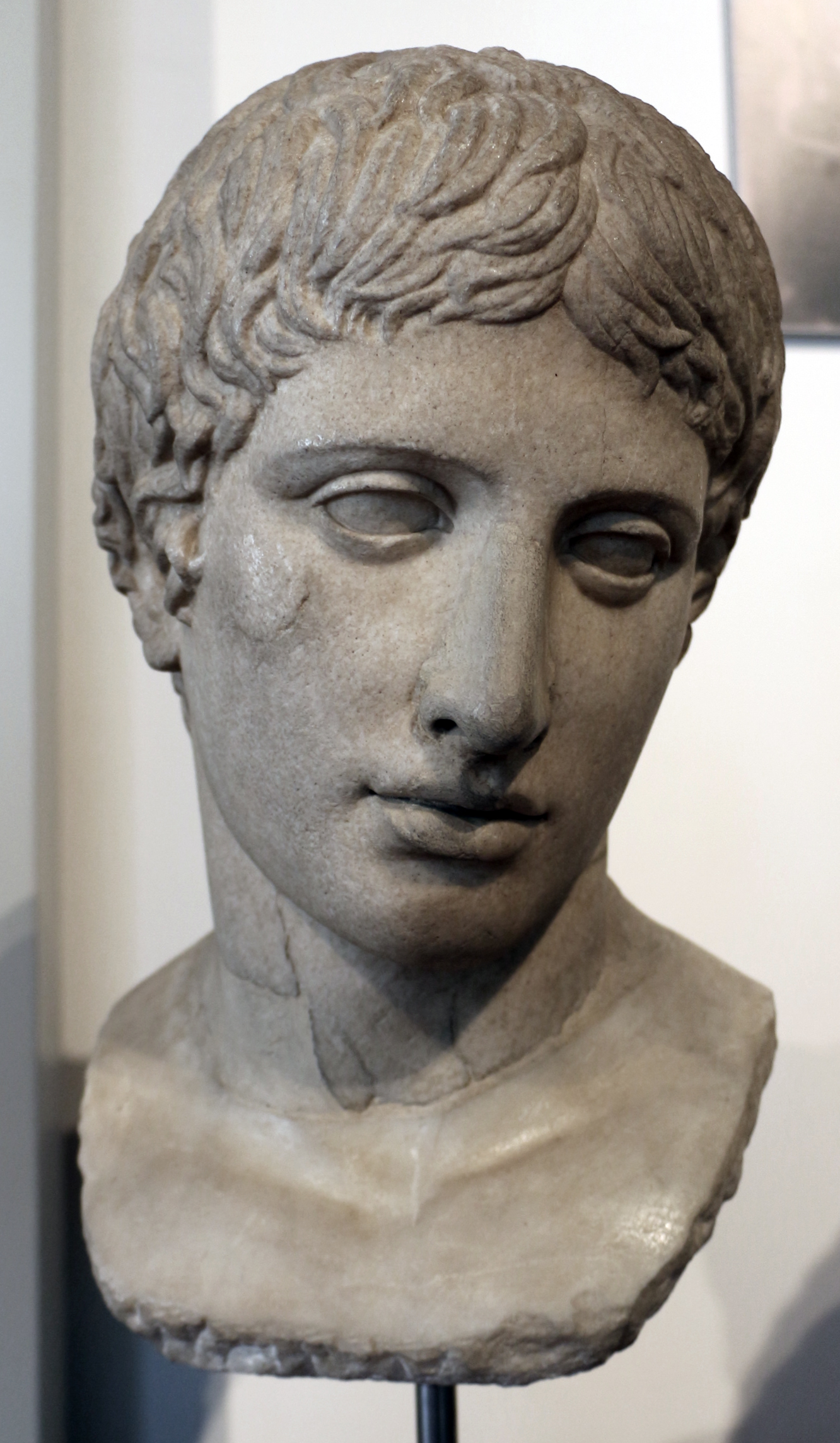
Bust of an ephebe, Roman copy, c. 420-400 BC

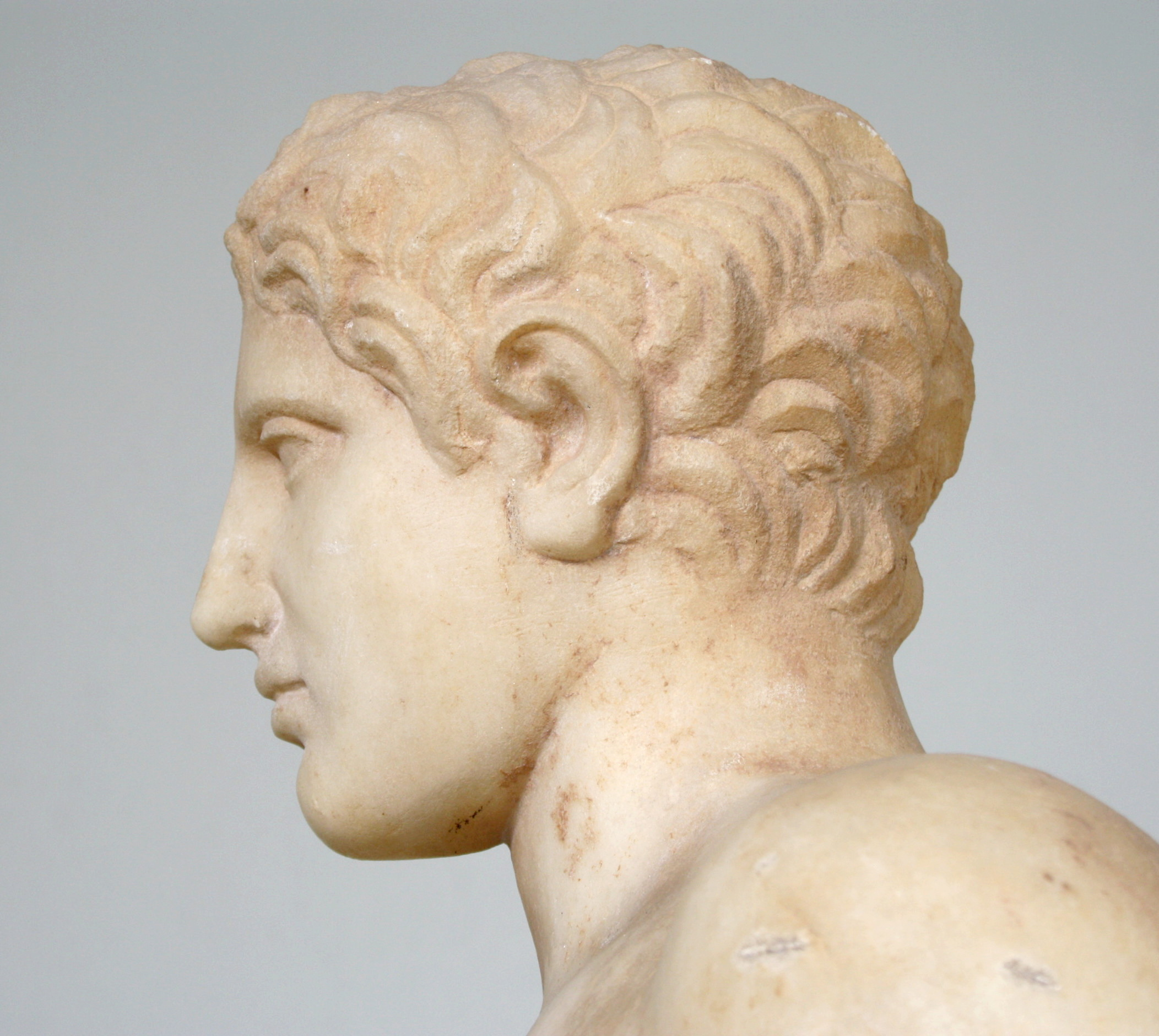
Marble statue of an ephebe (detail), c. 400 BC

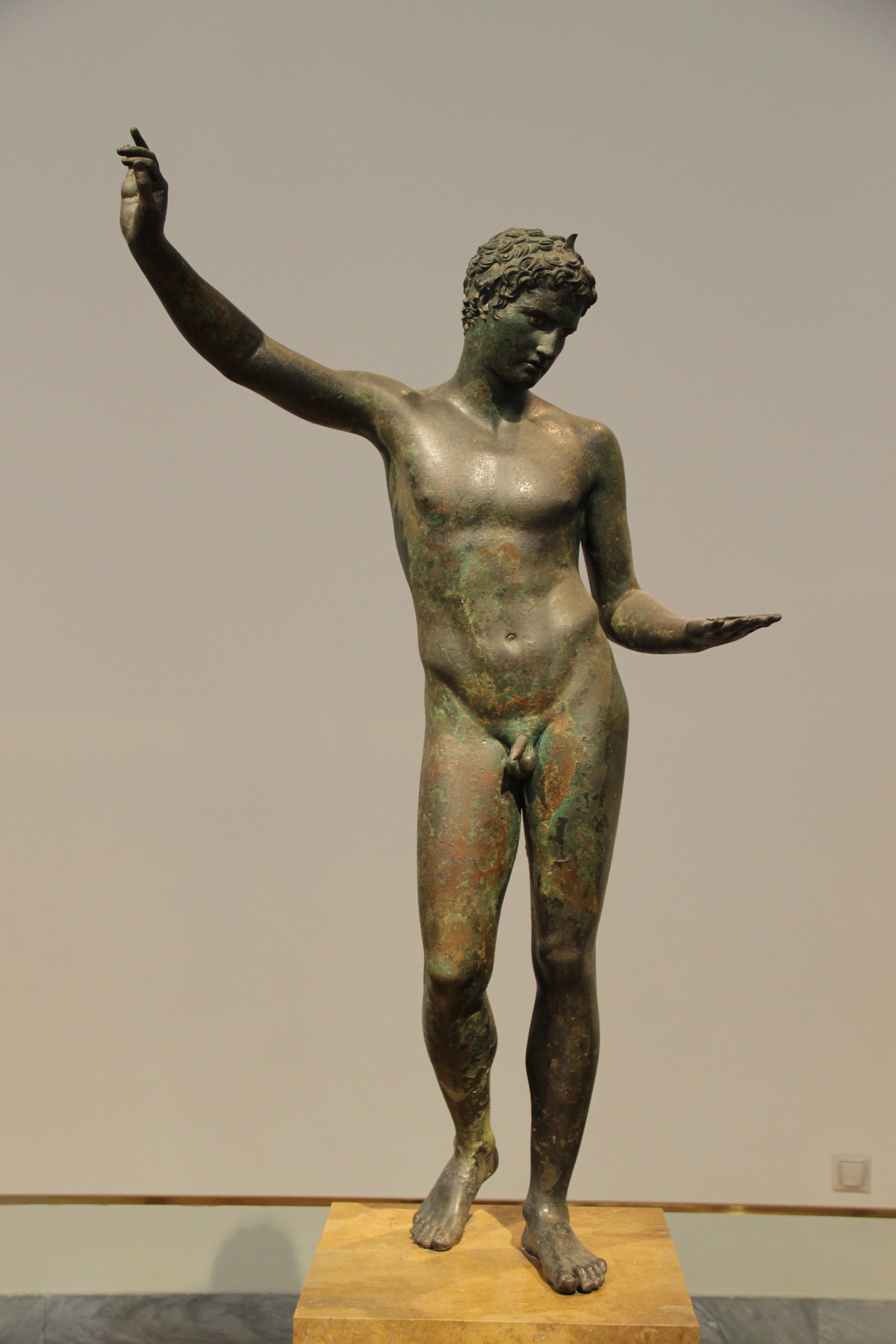
The Marathon Boy, c. 340-330 BC

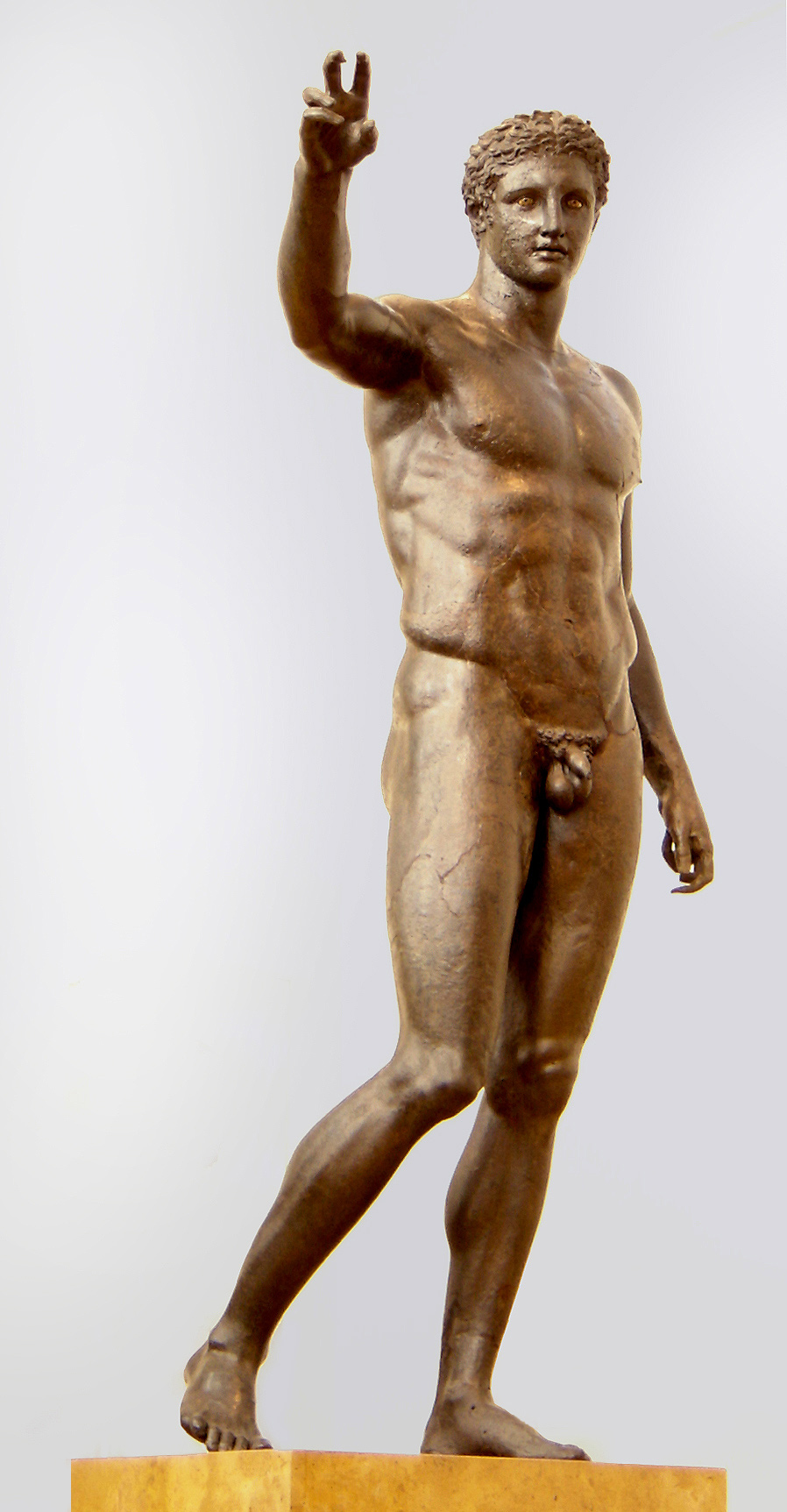
The Antikythera Ephebe, c. 340-330 BC

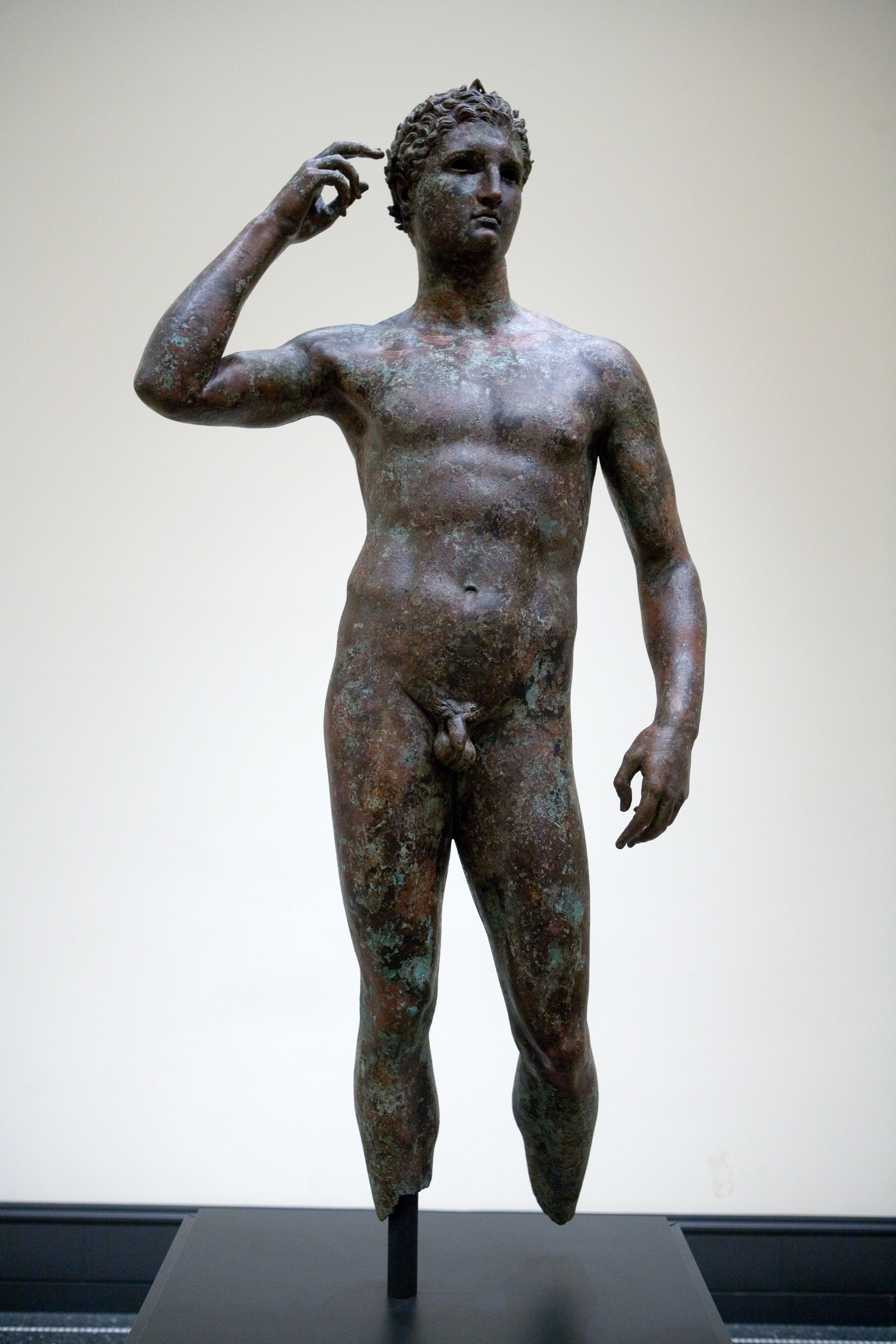
The Victorious Youth, c. 310 BC

== See also ==
- Bishōnen
- Ephebe, a fictional nation in Terry Pratchett's Discworld
- Ephebic oath
- Ephebophilia
- Kóryos
- Kouros
- Pauly-Wissowa
