= Ephebus (personal name) =

Ephebus (Ancient Greek: εφηβος, lit. 'adolescent male') often occurs as an individual name, as well as being a general epithet. People with the name include:

- Ephebus, a martyr from Terni, a city in central Italy
- Claudius Ephebus, mentioned in the first letter of Clement to the Corinthians, chapter 59, as a messenger of the church of Rome, sent to the Church of Corinth along with Valerius Bito and Fortunatus
- Saint Euphebius, a bishop of Naples
