= Ephebic oath =

Oath sworn by young men of Classical Athens upon induction into the Ephebic College

The ephebic oath was an oath sworn by young men of Classical Athens, typically eighteen-year-old sons of Athenian citizens, upon induction into the military academy, the Ephebic College, graduation from which was required to attain status as citizens. The applicant would have been dressed in full armour, shield and spear in his left hand, his right hand raised and touching the right hand of the moderator. The oath was quoted by the Attic orator Lycurgus, in his work Against Leocrates (4th century BC), though it is certainly archaic (5th century BC). The Ephebate, an organization for training the young men of Athens, chiefly in military matters, had existed since the 5th century but was reorganized by Lycurgus. The oath was taken in the temple of Aglaurus, daughter of Cecrops, probably at the age of eighteen when the youth underwent an examination (Greek: δοκιμασία) and had his name entered on the deme register. He was then an ephebos until the age of twenty.

== The oath ==
The ephebic oath is preserved on an inscription from Acharnae, which was written in the mid-fourth century BC. Other versions of the oath are preserved in the works of Stobaeus and Pollux.

=== Greek text ===
This is the oath, as preserved by Stobaeus.

"Οὐ καταισχυνῶ τὰ ὅπλα τὰ ἱερὰ, οὐδ' ἐγκαταλείψω τὸν παραστάτην ὅτῳ ἂν στοιχήσω· ἀμυνῶ δὲ καὶ ὑπὲρ ἱερῶν καὶ ὁσίων καὶ μόνος καὶ μετὰ πολλῶν. καὶ τὴν πατρίδα οὐκ ἐλάσσω παραδώσω, πλείω δὲ καὶ ἀρείω ὅσης ἂν παραδέξωμαι. καὶ εὐηκοήσω τῶν ἀεὶ κραινόντων ἐμφρόνως καὶ τοῖς θεσμοῖς τοῖς ἰδρυμένοις πείσομαι καὶ οὕστινας ἂν ἄλλους τὸ πλῆθος ἰδρύσηται ὁμοφρόνως καὶ ἂν τις ἀναιρῇ τοὺς θεσμοὺς ἢ μὴ πείθηται οὐκ ἐπιτρέψω, ἀμυνῶ δὲ καὶ μόνος καὶ μετὰ πολλῶν. καὶ ἱερὰ τὰ πάτρια τιμήσω. ἵστορες τούτων Ἄγλαυρος, Ἐνυάλιος, Ἄρης, Ζεύς, Θαλλώ, Αὐξώ, Ἡγεμόνη.

=== English translation ===
I will never bring reproach upon my hallowed arms, nor will I desert the comrade at whose side I stand, but I will defend our altars and our hearths, single-handed or supported by many. My native land I will not leave a diminished heritage but greater and better than when I received it. I will obey whoever is in authority and submit to the established laws and all others which the people shall harmoniously enact. If anyone tries to overthrow the constitution or disobeys it, I will not permit him, but will come to its defense, single-handed or with the support of all. I will honor the religion of my fathers. Let the gods be my witness, Agraulus, Enyalius, Ares, Zeus, Thallo, Auxo, Hegemone.

== Modern use ==
The oath has been revived for use in educational institutions worldwide as a statement of civic virtue.

=== Examples ===
I shall never bring disgrace to my city, nor shall I ever desert my comrades in the ranks: but I, both alone and with my many comrades, shall fight for the ideals and sacred things of the city. I shall willingly pay heed to whoever renders judgment with wisdom and shall obey both the laws already established and whatever laws the people in their wisdom shall establish. I, alone and with my comrades, shall resist anyone who destroys the laws or disobeys them. I shall not leave my city any less but rather greater than I found it.

— recited by incoming students at Townsend Harris High School

We will ever strive for the ideals and sacred things of the city, both alone and with many; We will unceasingly seek to quicken the sense of public duty; We will revere and obey the city’s laws; We will transmit this city not only not less, but greater, better and more beautiful than it was transmitted to us.

— found in the foyer of the Maxwell School of Citizenship and Public Affairs

I will not disgrace these sacred arms, nor ever desert a comrade in the ranks. I will guard the Temples and the Centers of Civic Life, and uphold the ideals of my Country, both alone and in concert with others. I will at all times obey the Magistrates and observe the Laws as well those at present in force as those the Majority may hereafter enact. Should any one seek to subvert those laws or set them aside, Him I will oppose either in common with others or alone. In these ways it shall be my constant aim not only to preserve the things of worth in my Native Land, but to make them of still greater worth.

— inscribed on a bronze plaque at the Thacher School, and given the title "Oath of the Young Men of Athens"

"We will never bring disgrace to this, our City, by any act of dishonesty or cowardice, nor ever desert our suffering comrades in the ranks. We will fight for the ideals and sacred things of our City, both alone and with many; we will revere and obey the City's laws and do our best to incite a like reverence and respect in those around us who are prone to annul them or set them at nought; we will strive unceasingly to quicken the public's sense of civic duty. Thus in all these ways, we will transmit this City not only not less, but to a great extent better and more beautiful than it was transmitted to us. Ludus supra praemium"

— the school song of Wolverhampton Girls’ High School
