= Jiří Frel =

Czech American art historian (1923–2006)

Frel in 1982 as curator at Getty

Jiří Frel (often spelled as Jiri Frel, 1923, Dolní Újezd, Czechoslovakia — 29 April 2006, Paris) was a Czech and American archaeologist. Between 1973 and 1986 he served as a curator for the J. Paul Getty Museum. He is credited with the expansion of the collection of antiquities of the museum, but he was also involved in a number of controversies, including a tax manipulation scheme to buy artifacts of dubious provenance and purchase of a number of artifacts widely considered to be fake.

Frel was born in Moravia and studied in Paris. He returned to Czechoslovakia after World War II and obtained a doctorate from Charles University in Prague. Subsequently, he was employed by the Greek and Roman art department of Charles University and taught there. In 1969, following the Soviet invasion, Frel emigrated to the United States. For a short period, he taught at Princeton University, subsequently worked as an associate curator of Greek and Roman art at the Metropolitan Museum of Art, and in 1973, he became the curator of the department of antiquities at the J. Paul Getty Museum.

During his tenure as curator, Frel considerably expanded the collection of Greek and Roman artifacts, transforming it to one of the leading museums of the world. He also recruited collectors to donate their items to the museum, apparently frustrated by the refusal of the management to buy new items which were not high-profile. To facilitate this, Frel designed a tax evasion scheme in which fictitious donors paid to an intermediary to get tax reductions for donations of artifacts they had never seen. The scam was uncovered by Thomas Hoving, and Frel had to resign in 1984. Before leaving the Getty Museum in 1986 he hired Marion True, the new curator, who was later charged with laundering stolen artifacts.
