= Mahdia shipwreck =

Archaeological site in Tunisia

Coordinates: 35°31′55″N 11°7′28″E

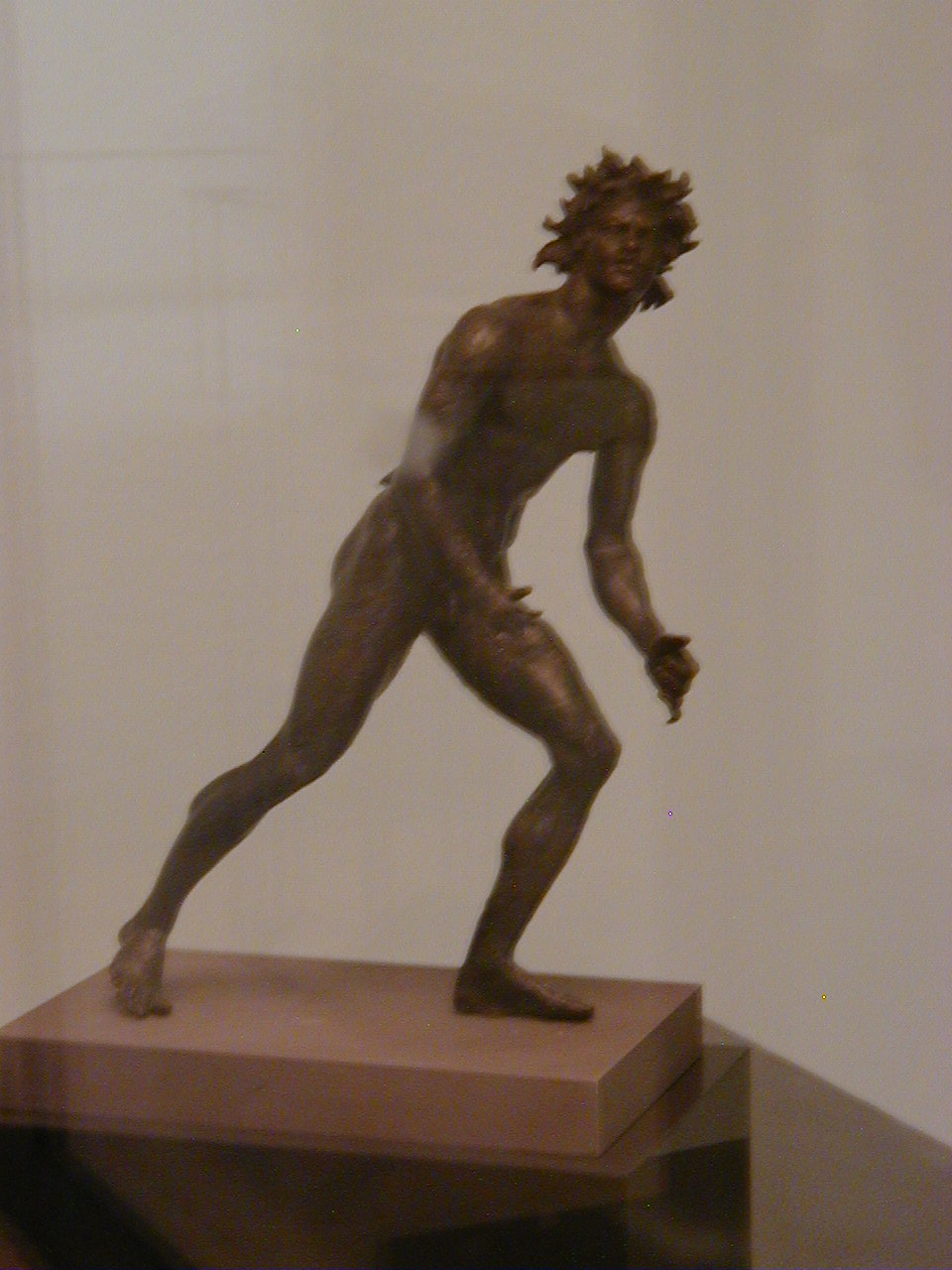
Bronze satyr (height 0.35m) from the Mahdia shipwreck (Musée National du Bardo, Tunis)

The shipwreck of Mahdia was found by Greek sponge fishermen off the coast of Tunisia in June 1907. The shipwreck near the modern town of Mahdia is dated to between 80 and 60 BC.

In a series of underwater campaigns, numerous items were recovered and placed on display at the Musée National du Bardo, Tunis. The greater part of the sculptures were salvaged between 1907 and 1913 by French archaeologist Alfred Merlin, at that time Director of Antiquities in the Protectorate of Tunisia. Further survey work on the site was done by a team led by Mensun Bound, but no further excavations have been possible.

== Cargo ==
A storm presumably drove the ship onto the north African coast en route from Piraeus, the port of Athens, to Italy, as it was carrying Greek works of art intended for Roman purchasers, marble and bronze sculptures, high-quality furniture fittings, decorative items, and architectural elements. These were later restored by researchers from the Rheinisches Landesmuseum Bonn in Germany. There were also several dozen heavy marble columns and parts of catapults.

It has been generally thought that the marble columns were removed and shipped by order of Lucius Cornelius Sulla after his sacking of Athens in 86 BC. None of the epic-scaled Homeric figures that gained popularity in the 1st century BC were to be found, nor any copies of Classical works of the 5th century, as Nikolaus Himmelmann pointed out, contrasting the Mahdia cargo with the similar cargo of the somewhat later Antikythera ship. Recovered was a marble bust probably of Ariadne, two large-scale bronzes, a herm figure of a turbaned Dionysus, inscribed with the name of its maker, Boëthos of Chalcedon, and a lithe, winged olive-wreathed boy, identified by scholars as Agon or Eros Enagonios, Eros as lord of contests, a bronze bust of Ariadne, and two bronze figurines of dancing dwarfs.

Among five smaller bronzes, found at the site in 1910, was the satyr illustrated at right. The site also contained lead objects, including anchors, tubes, and plates, and ingots that, according to their isotope-composition, seem to come from the Sierra de Cartagena in Spain.

== See also ==
- List of shipwrecks
