= Antikythera Ephebe =

Greek bronze statue

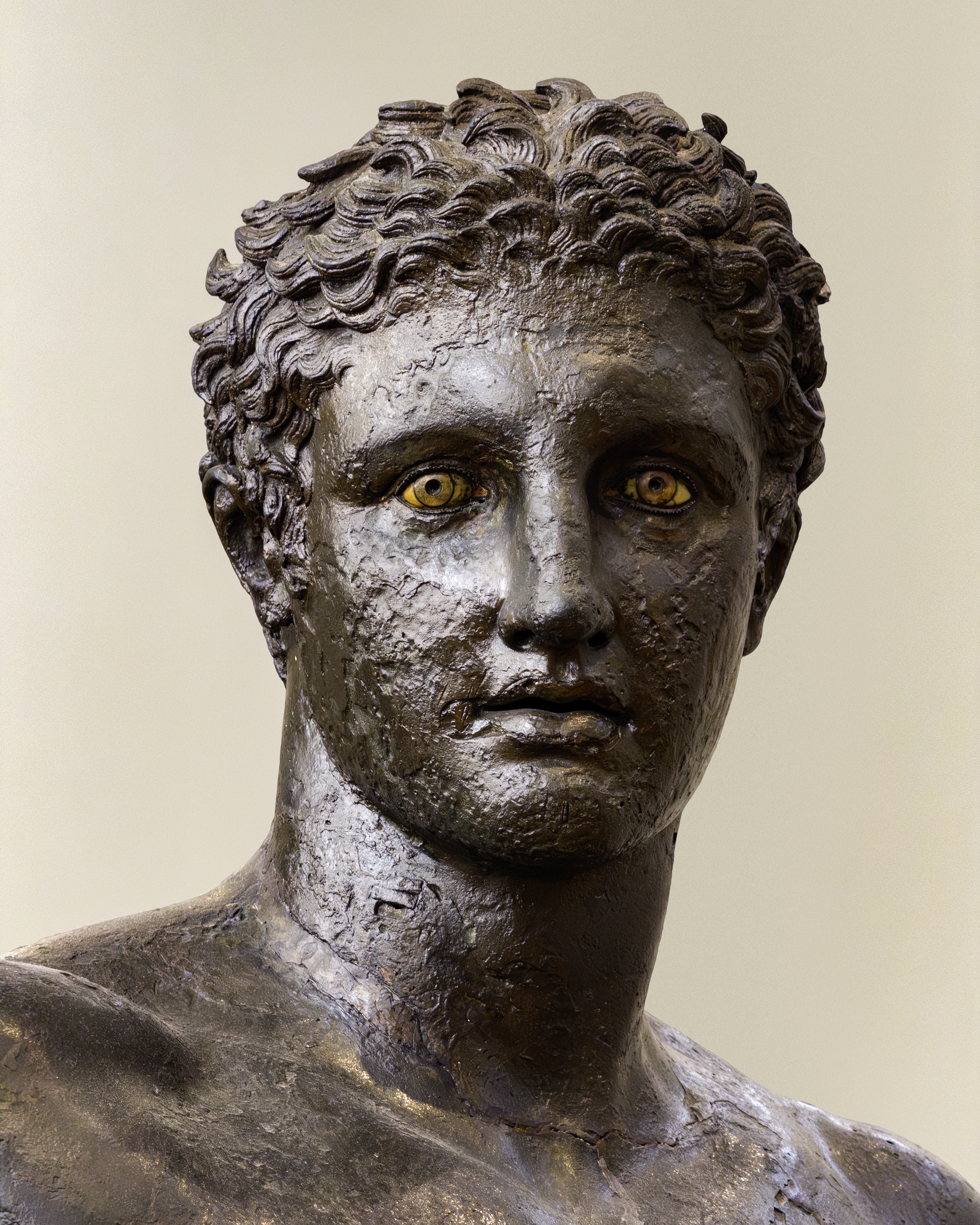
- Material: Bronze
- Height: 1.96 meters
- Created: c. 340–330 BC
- Discovered: 1900; Aegean Sea, Mediterranean Sea
- Present location: Athens, Attica, Greece

The Antikythera Ephebe, registered as Bronze statue of a youth in the museum collections, is a Greek bronze statue of a young man of languorous grace that was found in 1900 by sponge-divers in the area of the ancient Antikythera shipwreck off the island of Antikythera, Greece. It was the first of the series of Greek bronze sculptures that the Aegean and Mediterranean yielded up in the twentieth century which have fundamentally altered the modern view of ancient Greek sculpture. The wreck site, which is dated about 70–60 BC, also yielded the Antikythera mechanism (an astronomical calculating device), a characterful head of a Stoic philosopher, and a hoard of coins. The coins included a disproportionate quantity of Pergamene cistophoric tetradrachms and Ephesian coins, leading scholars to surmise that it had begun its journey on the Ionian coast, perhaps at Ephesus; none of its recovered cargo has been identified as from mainland Greece.

== Description of the statue ==
The Ephebe, which measures 1.96 meters, slightly over lifesize, was retrieved in numerous fragments. Its first restoration was revised in the 1950s, under the direction of Christos Karouzos, changing the focus of the eyes, the configuration of the abdomen, the connection between the torso and the right upper thigh and the position of the right arm; the re-restoration is universally considered a success.

== Possible origin ==
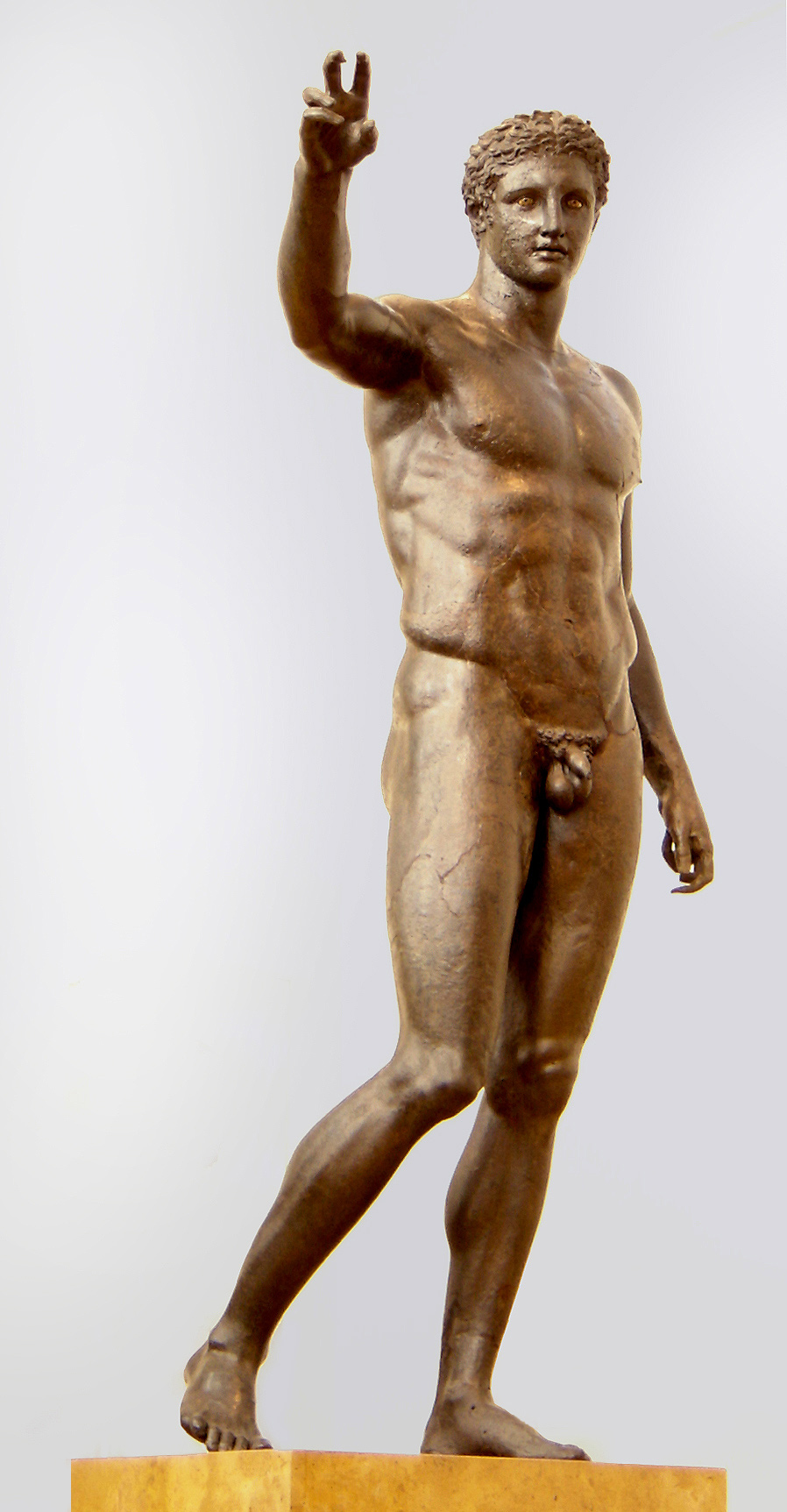
The Antikythera Ephebe or Youth

The Ephebe does not correspond to any familiar iconographic model, and there are no known copies of the type. He held a spherical object in his right hand, and possibly may have represented Paris presenting the Apple of Discord to Aphrodite; however, since Paris is consistently depicted cloaked and with the distinctive Phrygian cap, other scholars have suggested a beardless, youthful Heracles with the Apple of the Hesperides. It has also been suggested that the youth is a depiction of Perseus holding the head of the slain Gorgon. It could also be the God Apollo, a "Learned" Hermes holding a caduceus and declaiming, an athlete holding some sort of prize (a spherical lekythion), or a sphere, a wreathe, a phiale, or an apple. The statue could even be the funerary statue of a young man.

The statue, dated to around 340–330 BC, is one of the most brilliant products of Peloponnesian bronze sculpture; the individuality and character it displays have encouraged speculation on its possible sculptor. It is, perhaps, the work of the famous sculptor Euphranor, trained in the Polyclitan tradition, who did make a sculpture of Paris, according to Pliny:

By Euphranor is an Alexander [Paris]. This work is specially admired, because the eye can detect in it at once the judge of the goddesses, the lover of Helen, and yet the slayer of Achilles.

The Antikythera Youth is conserved in the National Archaeological Museum of Athens.

== Gallery ==
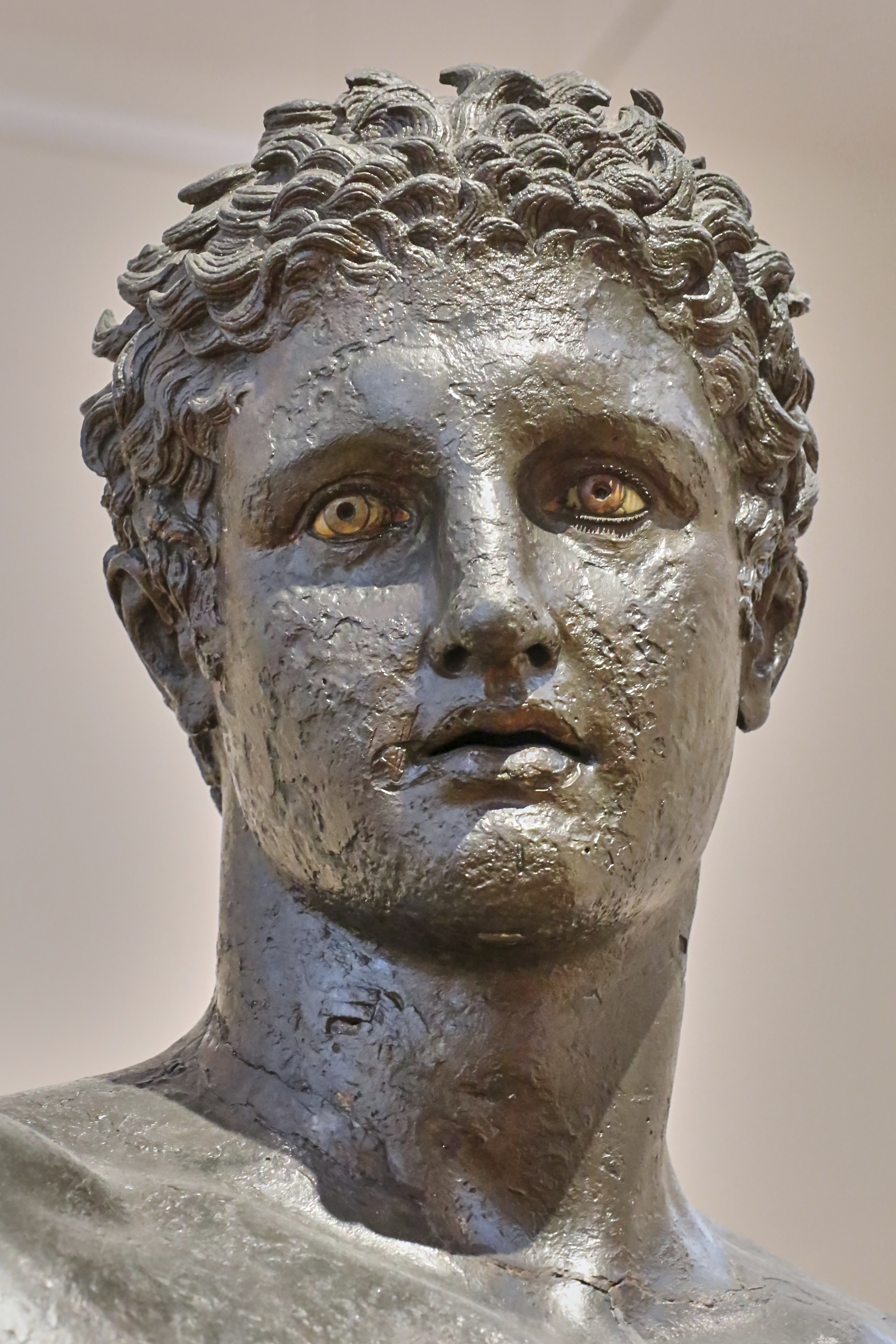

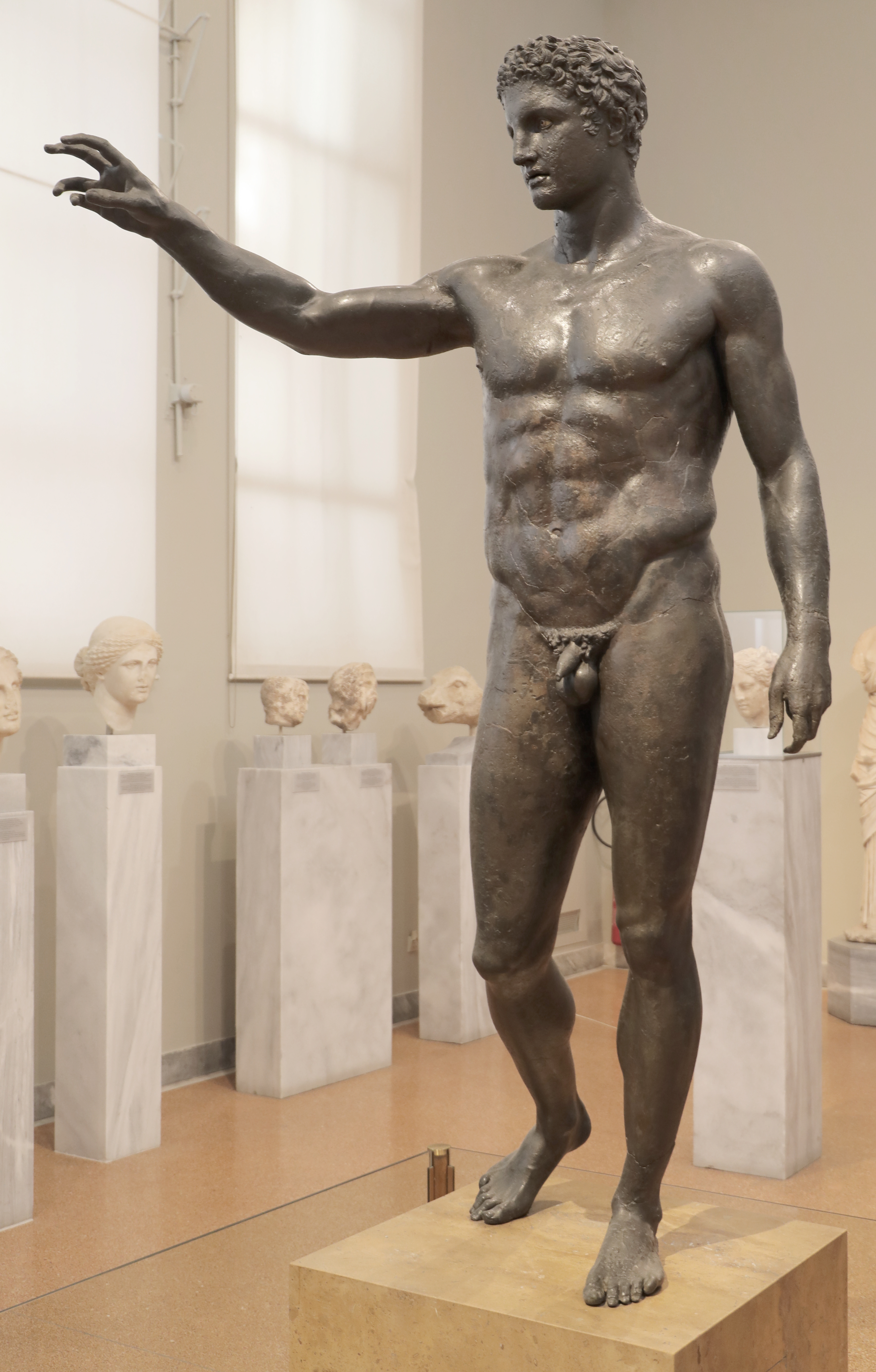

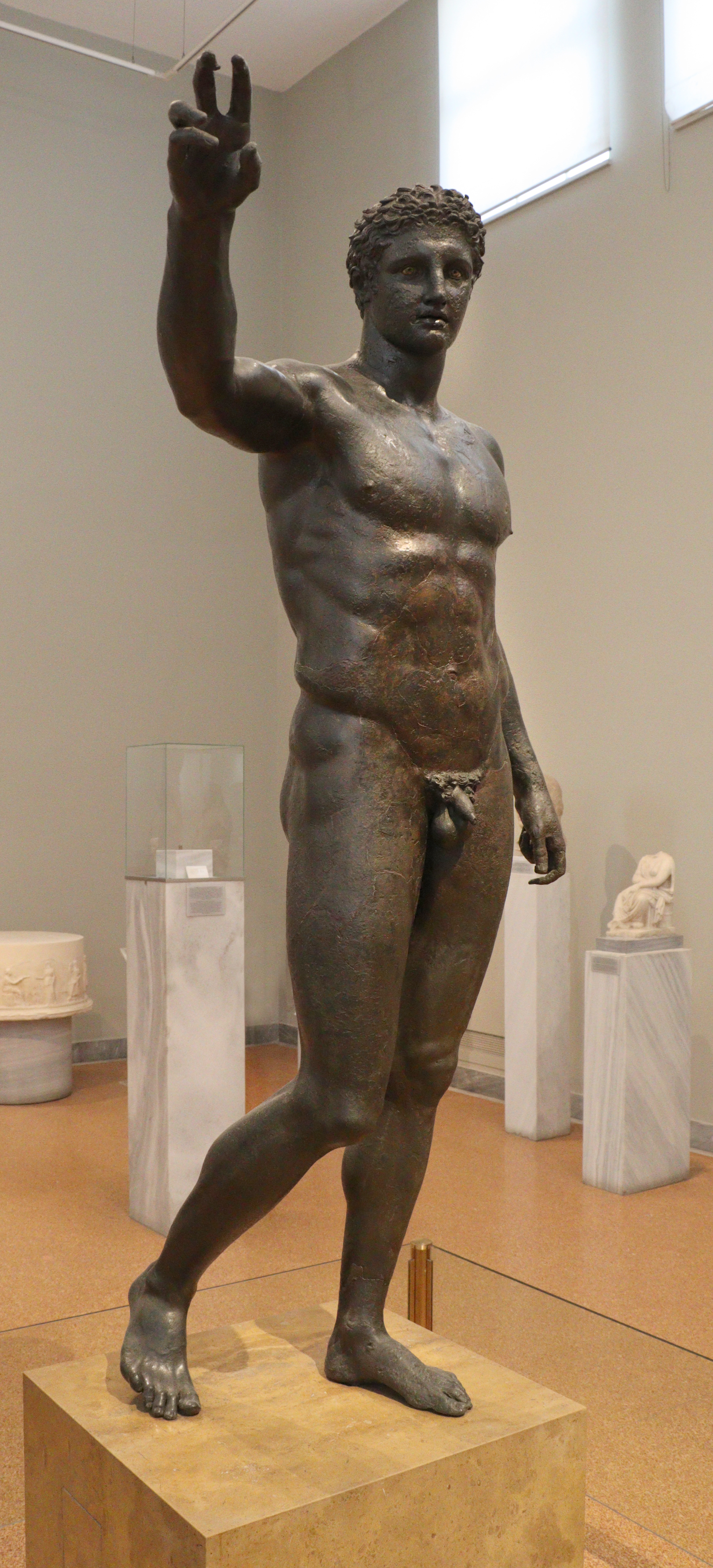

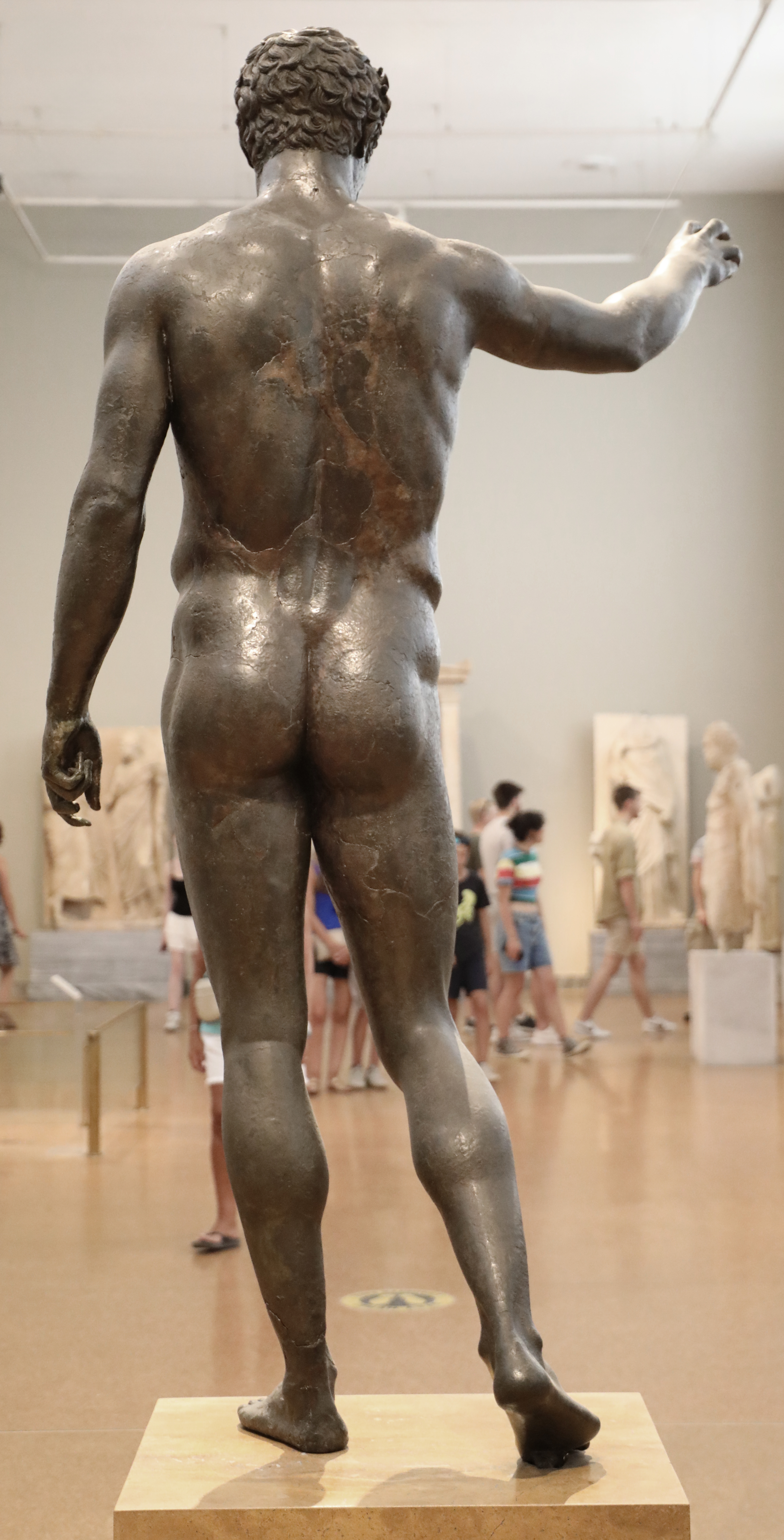

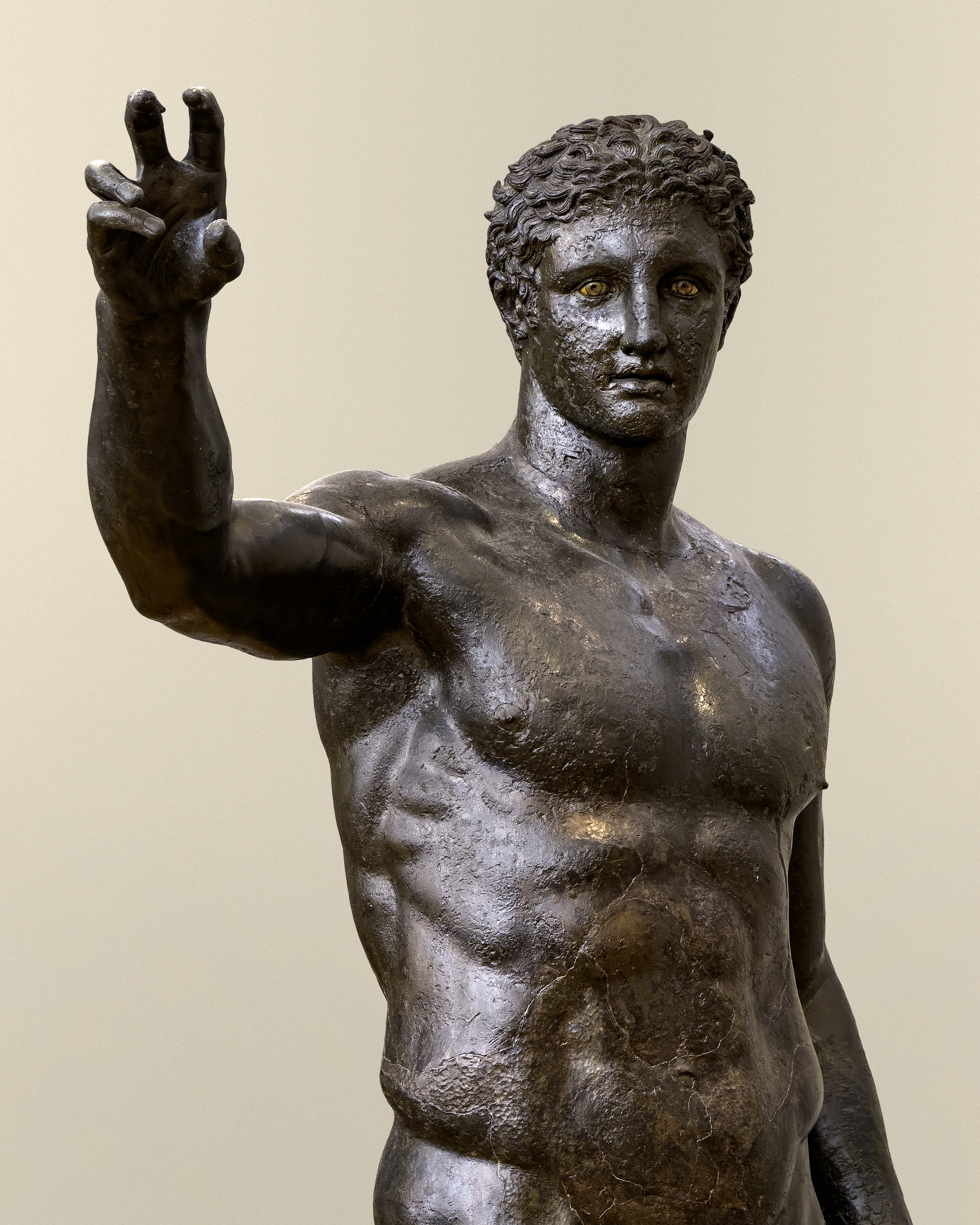
