= Artemision Bronze =

Ancient Greek sculpture

Coordinates: 37.9889°N 23.7322°E

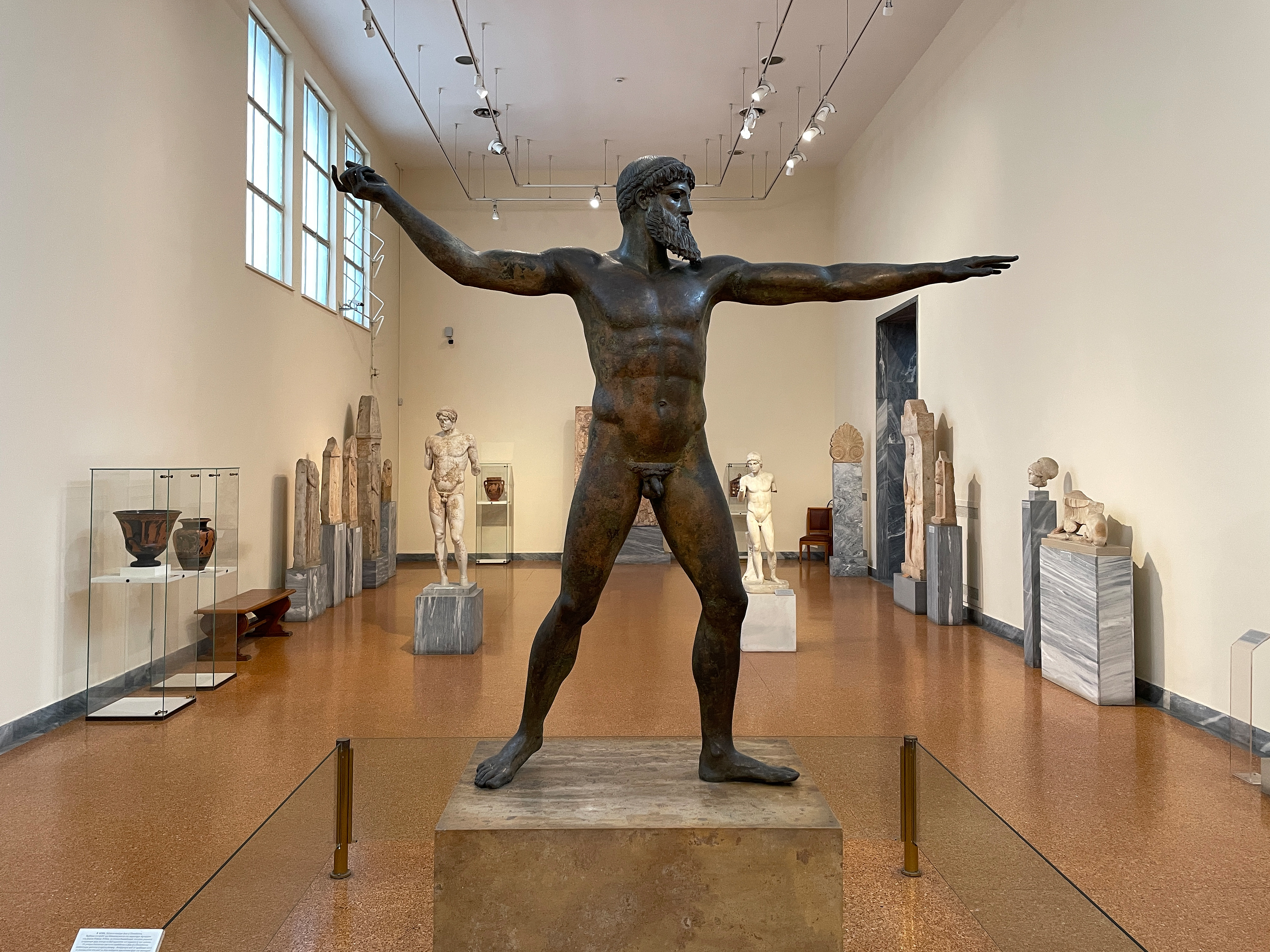
- Material: Bronze
- Height: 2.09 meters
- Created: c. 450 BC
- Discovered: 1926; Aegean Sea, Mediterranean Sea
- Present location: Athens, Attica, Greece

The Artemision Bronze (often called the God from the Sea) is an ancient Greek sculpture that was recovered from the sea off Cape Artemision, in northern Euboea, Greece. According to most scholars, the bronze represents Zeus, the thunder-god and king of gods, though it has also been suggested it might represent Poseidon. The statue is slightly over lifesize at 2.09 meters, and would have held either a thunderbolt, if Zeus, or a trident if Poseidon. The empty eye sockets were originally inset, probably with bone, as well as the eyebrows (with silver), the lips, and the nipples (with copper). The sculptor is unknown. The statue is a highlight of the collections in the National Archaeological Museum of Athens.

== Subject ==
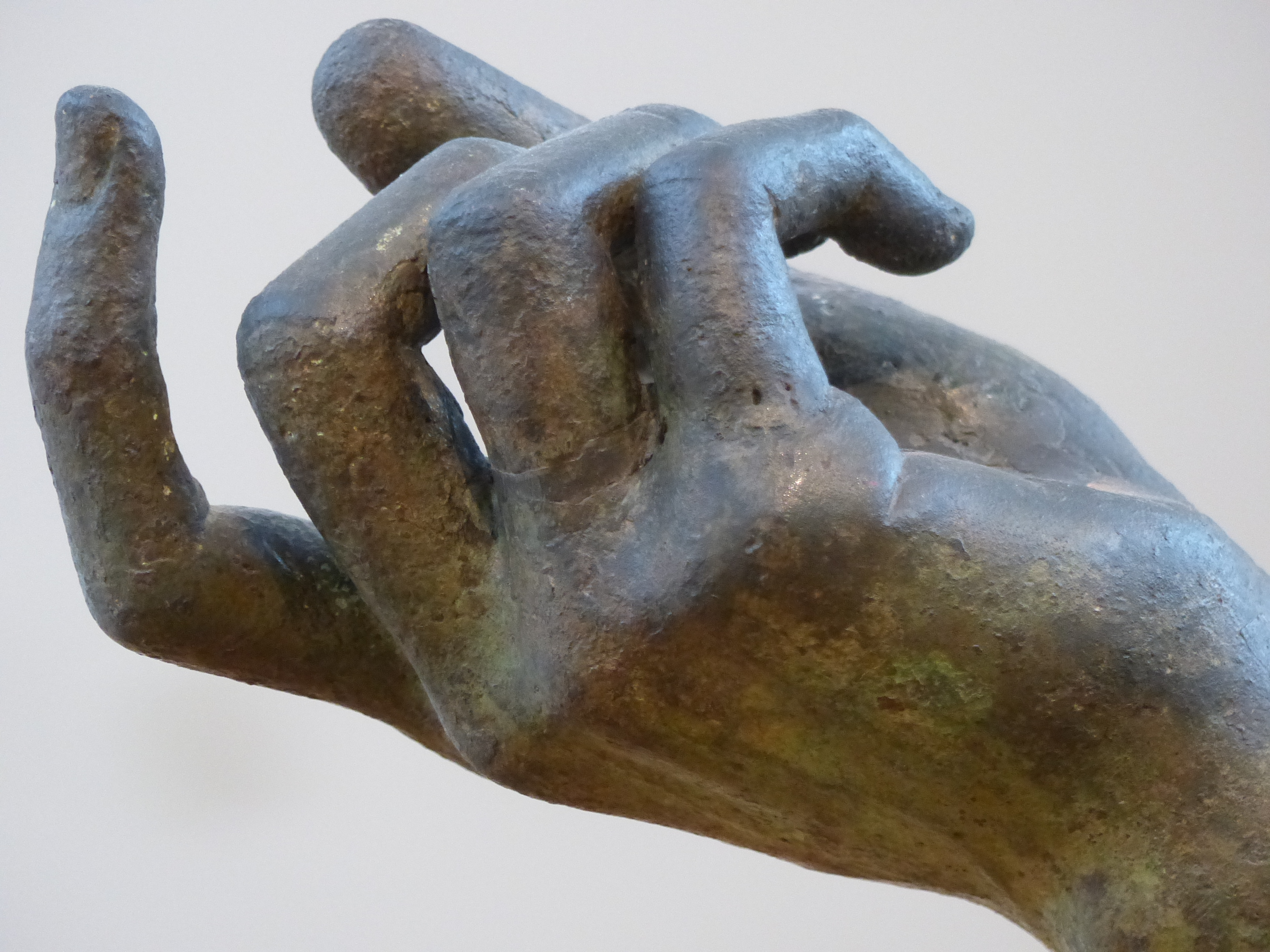
The statue's grasping hand. Scholars have debated whether it originally held Zeus' thunderbolt or Poseidon's trident.

The debate over whether the statue represents Poseidon or Zeus hinges on the lost attribute held in the figure's right hand. As Caroline Houser writes, "Sometimes the Artemision protector is called 'Poseidon'. Those who would do so have been known to argue that the image must be that of the great sea god since the statue was found in the Mediterranean. But like other statues of totally different subjects, this one went into the sea simply because it was on board a ship that sank. Others cite the example of the Poseidonia coins, overlooking the much weightier evidence presented by the numerous surviving statuettes of Zeus launching his thunderbolt in a pose matching that of the Artemision figure."

A major additional problem with that hypothesis is that a trident would obscure the face, especially from the profile view, which most scholars (even those who have supported an identification as Poseidon) have held to be the most, or even the only, important view. Iconographic parallels with coins and vase painting from the same time period show that this obscuring pose is extremely unlikely. However, the trident may have been unusually short, avoiding the problem. On the other hand, the statue is essentially a larger version of an extensive series of smaller solid bronze figurines extending back into the late 7th century, all of which strike the same pose and represent Zeus. On the basis of this and other iconographic parallels with vase-painting, most scholars presently think it is a Zeus. However, opinion remains divided.

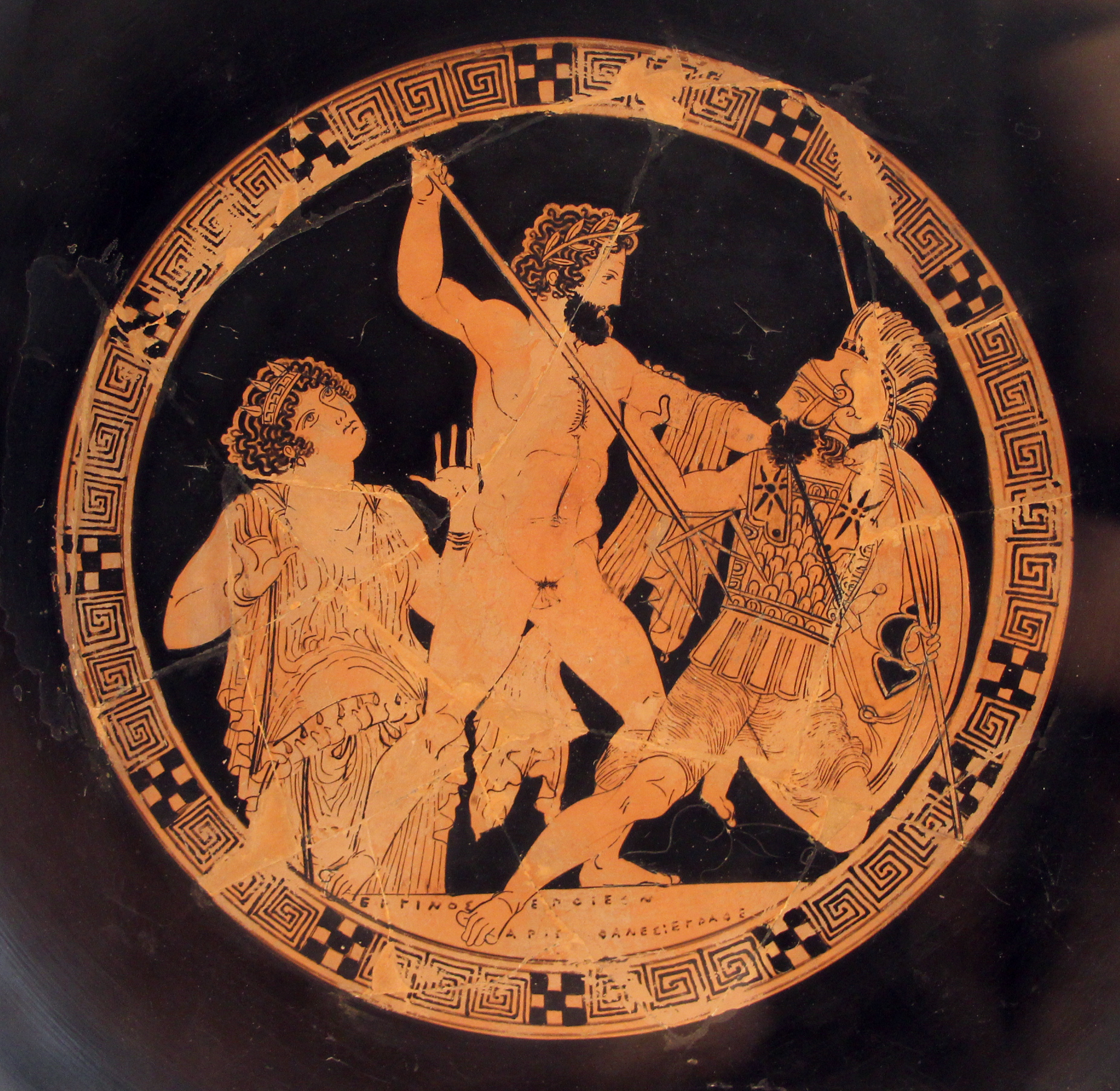
Poseidon attacks Polybotes with an overhand thrust. Red-figure cup, late fifth century BC (Antikensammlung Berlin F2531)

The iconography of Ancient Greek pottery typically portrays Poseidon wielding his trident in combat in more of a stabbing motion, similar to a fencing stance or an 'advance-lunge'; see for example 'Poseidon and the Giant Polybotes', an Attic red-figure stamnos attributed to the Troilos Painter. Meanwhile, Zeus is typically depicted fighting with his arm raised, holding the lightning bolt overhead, in the same position as the Artemision Bronze; see 'Zeus hurling his lightning at Typhon', a black-figure Chalcidian hydria c. 550 BC. Still, depictions of Poseidon fighting overhand do exist.

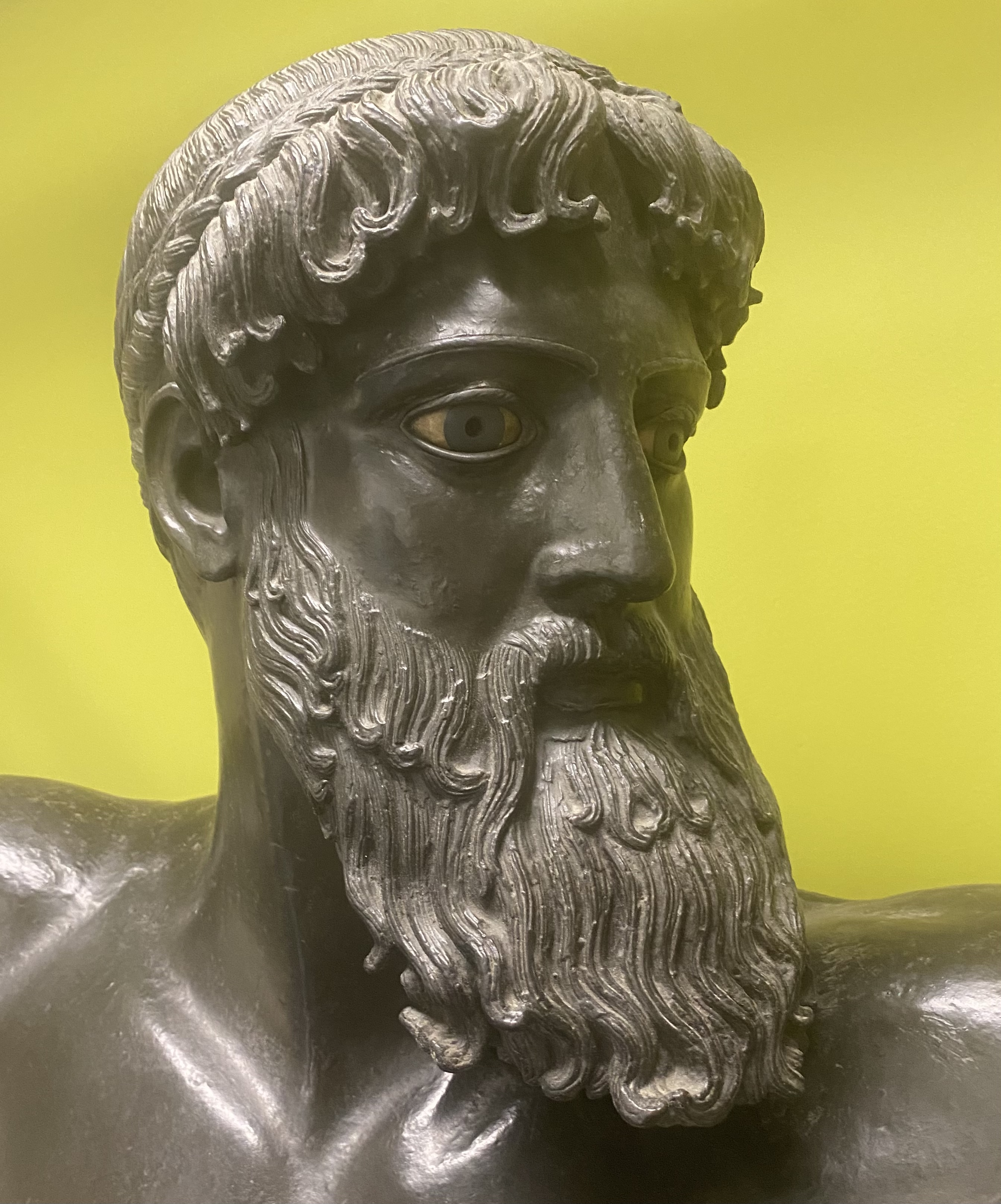
A modern cast of the statue. This example has hypothetical inset eyes.

The god is caught at the moment of pause in the full potentiality of his coming movement, described by Carol Mattusch: "the figure has the potential for violence, is concentrating, poised to throw, but the action is just beginning, and we are left to contemplate the coming demonstration of strength." It is an original work of great strength in the Severe style that preceded the fifth-century classical style, dated to c. 460 BC. A comparison can be made with the Charioteer of Delphi, a roughly contemporaneous bronze.

== Sculptor ==
Discussions concerning its provenance have found champions for most of the Greek mainland centers technically capable of such a large-scale sculpture: Attica— where Christos Karouzos associates it with Kalamis (around 470–440 BCE) — Boeotia, Aegina, Sicyon or Argos. The sculpture has also been associated with Onatas or Myron and also Kritios and Nesiotes but there is no way of knowing for certain who created the work.

== History ==
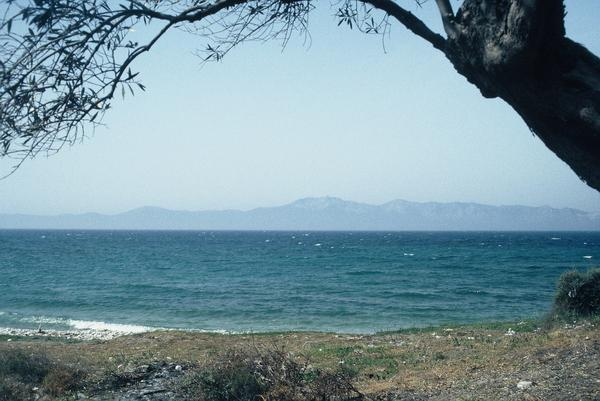
Beach at Cape Artemisium where the statue was found. Magnesia in the distance.

The sculpture was first discovered in 1926 and further excavated in 1928, at the site of a shipwreck that occurred no earlier than the middle of the second century BC. Unfortunately, not much is known about the wreck, because exploration was abandoned when a diver died in 1928, and was never resumed. Many such shipwrecks are of Roman date and were of vessels looting Greek art to Italy, but it is unclear whether the Artemision wreck is one of these. The Jockey of Artemision – a bronze statue of a racehorse and its jockey – was recovered from the same shipwreck, and Seán Hemingway has suggested that the jockey and horse may have been looted from Corinth in 146 BC by the Roman general Mummius in the Achaean War and was on its way to Pergamon when lost.

The sculpture's head, now an icon of Hellenic culture, formed the subject of a Greek 500 drachma postage stamp (in use 1954–1977) and a 1,000 drachma banknote (first issue 1970, replaced in 1987).

== See also ==
- Charioteer of Delphi
- Riace bronzes

== References and sources ==
Sources

- F. Noack in Die Antike 5 (1929), pp
- Mylonas in American Journal of Archaeology 48 (1944) pp 143ff. A case for the subject as Zeus.
- Carol C. Mattusch: Greek Bronze Statuary: From the Beginnings Through the Fifth Century B.C. (Ithaca:Cornell University Press 1988, pp. 150–153.
- Dafas, K. A., 2019. Greek Large-Scale Bronze Statuary: The Late Archaic and Classical Periods, Institute of Classical Studies, School of Advanced Study, University of London, Bulletin of the Institute of Classical Studies, Monograph, BICS Supplement 138 (London), pp. 36–50, pls 31–40.
