= Sepias =

Former town

Coordinates: 39°28′30″N 23°05′07″E

Sepias (Ancient Greek: Σηπιάς) was a town of Magnesia in ancient Thessaly, near the cape of the same name. Strabo relates that Sepias was one of the towns, along with Nelia, Pagasae, Ormenium, Rhizus, Olizon, Boebe, and Iolcus that were reduced to mere villages when being depopulated by Demetrius Poliorcetes to populate Demetrias. At the cape, the fleet of Xerxes I suffered heavily during a storm shortly before the Battle of Thermopylae.

The town (or fort) of Sepias is located at the modern site of Pouri.
