= Aeson (disambiguation) =

Aeson is a figure in Greek mythology.

Aeson or Aison (ancient Greek: Αἰσών or Αἴσων) may also refer to:

- Aeson (Thessaly), a town in ancient Thessaly
- Aeson (Thrace), a town in ancient Thrace
- Aesion, an Athenian orator
- Aison (vase painter), the red-figure painter
