= Olizon =

Greek city

Coordinates: 39°08′07″N 23°13′02″E

Map showing ancient Thessaly. Olizon is shown to the lower right opposite Euboea (shown in pink).

Olizon (Ancient Greek: Ὀλιζών) was an ancient Greek town and polis (city-state) of Magnesia located in the region of Thessaly. Olizon is mentioned by Homer, who gives it the epithet of "rugged"; and in the Catalogue of Ships in the Iliad, Olizon formed part of the territories of Philoctetes.

It is also mentioned in the Periplus of Pseudo-Scylax as a city in Magnesia, together with Iolcus, Spalauthra, Methone and Coracae. In Strabo's time, it formed part of the dependent territories of Demetrias on a section of the coast where Thaumacia and Meliboea also stood. Plutarch wrote that it was located opposite Artemisium in Euboea.

Olizon is located at the Palaiokastro (old fort) at Agios Andreas.

== Sources ==
- Hansen, Mogens Herman; Nielsen, Thomas Heine (2004). An Inventory of Archaic and Classical Poleis. Oxford and New York: Oxford University Press. ISBN 0198140991.
