= Amolbos =

Town in ancient Thessaly

Amolbos (Ancient Greek: Ἃμολβος) was a town of Magnesia in ancient Thessaly.

Its site is unlocated.
