= Poeas =

In Greek mythology, Poeas, or Poias (Ancient Greek: Ποίας) was a king of Meliboea or Malis (Maleae) and one of the Argonauts.

== Family ==
Poeas was the son of King Thaumacus of Thaumacia and the father of the hero Philoctetes by Methone.

== Mythology ==
As an Argonaut, Poeas is identified as the greatest archer of the group. When facing the giant Talos, some accounts say Medea drugged the bronze giant and Poeas shot an arrow to poison him in his heel. Other sources cited his son Philoctetes as one of the Argonauts instead of him.

More famously, Poeas had a role in the apotheosis of Heracles, his friend. When Heracles realized he was dying from poisonous centaur blood he demanded a funeral pyre built and lit once he stood atop it. As none of his own men would light the pyre, a passer-by (Poeas) was asked by Heracles to light it. In return for this favor Heracles bestowed his famed bow and poison arrows upon Poeas. Other versions, had Philoctetes as the passer-by or that Poeas assigned Philoctetes the task.
