= Peiresiai =

Peiresiai (Ancient Greek: Πειρεσίαι) was a town of Magnesia in ancient Thessaly.

Its site is unlocated.
