= Isai Limen =

Historic town in Magnesia, Aeolia, Ancient Greece

Isai Limen (Ancient Greek: Ἴσαι Λιμήν) was a port town of Magnesia in ancient Thessaly, mentioned in the Periplus of Pseudo-Scylax.

Its site is unlocated.
