= Aixoneia =

Aixoneia (Ancient Greek: Αἰξώνεια) was a town of Magnesia in ancient Thessaly.

Its site is unlocated.
