= Oxoniae =

Oxoniae or Oxoniai (Ancient Greek: Ὀξωνιαί) was an ancient Greek town and polis (city-state) of Magnesia located in the region of Thessaly. The name is not attested by the demonym (Ὀξωνιαῖος) is in an inscription dated to 358 BCE. Its current location has not been found.

== Sources ==
- Hansen, Mogens Herman; Nielsen, Thomas Heine (2004). An Inventory of Archaic and Classical Poleis. Oxford and New York: Oxford University Press. ISBN 0198140991.
