= Nelia (disambiguation) =

Nelia was an ancient city in Greece.

Nelia may also refer to:

- Nelia (butterfly), a genus of butterflies within the Pronophilina subtribe
- Nelia (plant), a genus of flowering plants in family Aizoaceae
- Nelia, a common name of Acacia loderi, an Australian plant species
- Nelia, Queensland, Australia
- Nelia (film), a 2021 Philippine film

== People ==
- Nélia Barbosa (born 1998), French paracanoeist
- Nelia Martins (born 1998), East Timorese runner
- Nelia Penman (1915–2017), British politician and barrister
- Nelia Sancho (1951–2022), Filipino activist and beauty queen
- Nelya Shtepa (born 1960), Ukrainian politician
