= Classical sculpture =

Sculpture from classical antiquity

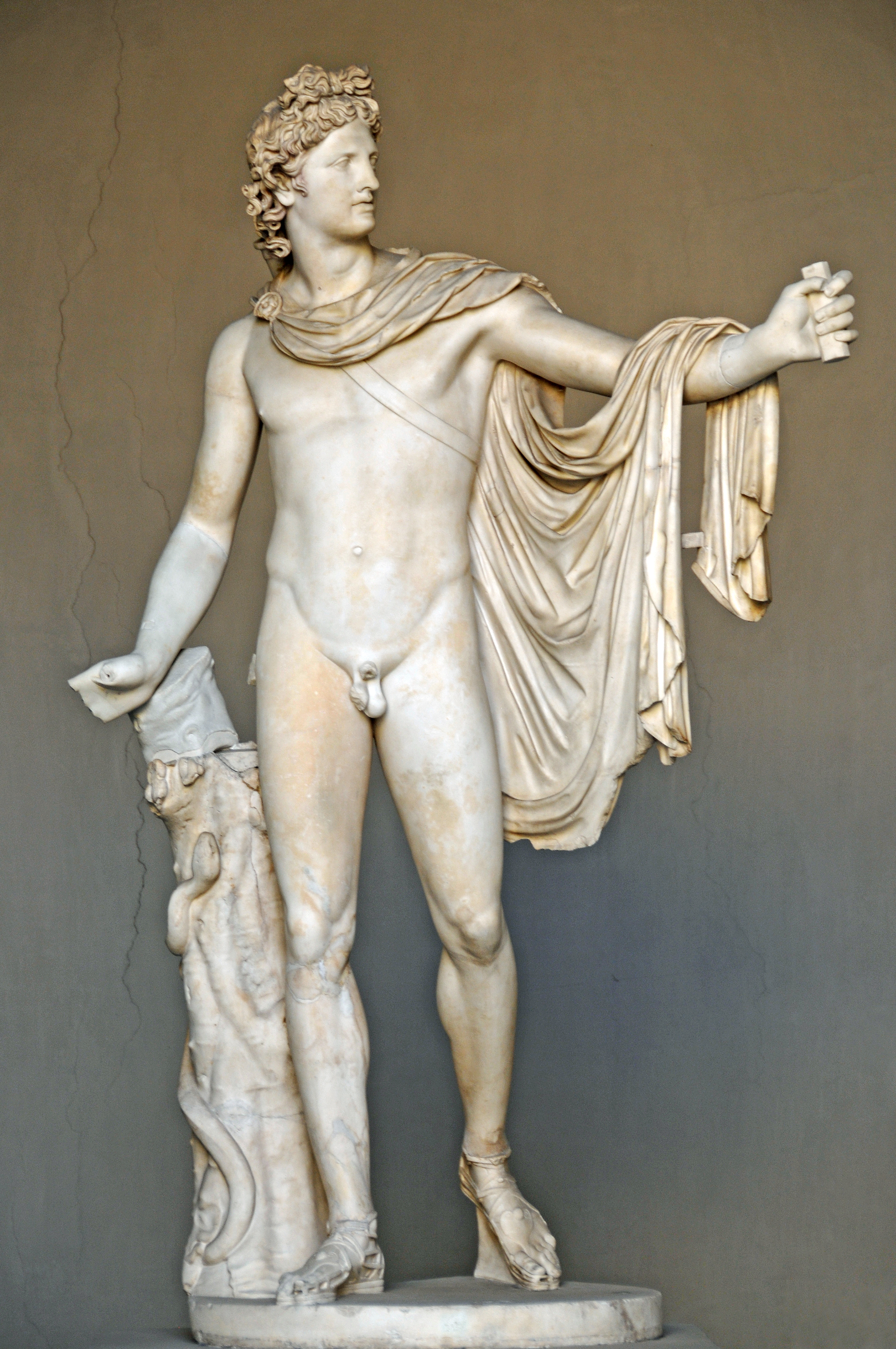
Leochares: Apollo Belvedere. Roman copy of 130–140 AD after a Greek bronze original of 330–320 BC. Vatican Museums

Classical sculpture (usually with a lower case "c") refers generally to sculpture from Ancient Greece and Ancient Rome, as well as the Hellenized and Romanized civilizations under their rule or influence, from about 500 BC to around 200 AD. It may also refer more precisely a period within Ancient Greek sculpture from around 500 BC to the onset of the Hellenistic style around 323 BC, in this case usually given a capital "C". The term "classical" is also widely used for a stylistic tendency in later sculpture, not restricted to works in a Neoclassical or classical style.

The main subject of Ancient Greek sculpture from its earliest days was the human figure, usually male and nude (or nearly so). Apart from the heads of portrait sculptures, the bodies were highly idealized but achieved an unprecedented degree of naturalism. In addition to freestanding statues, the term classical sculpture incorporates relief work, such as the frieze and metopes of the Parthenon.

Although making large or monumental sculptures almost ceased in the Early Middle Ages and in Byzantine art, it greatly revived in the Italian Renaissance as Roman examples were excavated, and classical sculpture remained a great influence until at least the 19th century.

== Ancient Greek sculpture ==
There are several periods:

=== Archaic period ===
The most important sculptural form of the Archaic period was the kouros (plural: kouroi), the standing male nude (See for example Biton and Kleobis). Reflecting Egyptian influence, the kouros stands upright with his left leg slightly forward and his arms at his sides. Although kouroi have been found in many ancient Greek territories, they were especially prominent in Attica and Boiotia. The preponderance of these were found in sanctuaries of Apollo with more than one hundred from the sanctuary of Apollo Ptoion, Boeotia, alone. These free-standing sculptures were typically marble, but the form is also rendered in limestone, wood, bronze, ivory and terracotta. They are typically life-sized, though early colossal examples are up to 3 metres tall.

Archaic Greek sculptors seem to have been influenced stylistically by the Egyptians, although divergences appeared early on. In particular, the male figures of Archaic Greece tended to be represented in the nude, while this was uncommon during all periods of ancient Egyptian art (except when slaves or enemies were depicted). As in Egyptian art, female subjects were always portrayed clothed; female nudity would not appear until much later on. The pursed and minutely upturned lips and empty gaze identified as the "archaic smile" appears on many defining works of the Archaic period.

In this period, the later emphasis on naturalistic bone and muscle anatomy had not yet developed, which can be seen in observing details such as the knees and other critical joints. Some details seem to be "incised" rather than fully modelled, a relic of more ancient traditions. As the Archaic style gradually transformed into what is known as the Classical style, a clear progression displaying more and more technical knowledge and skill can be detected.

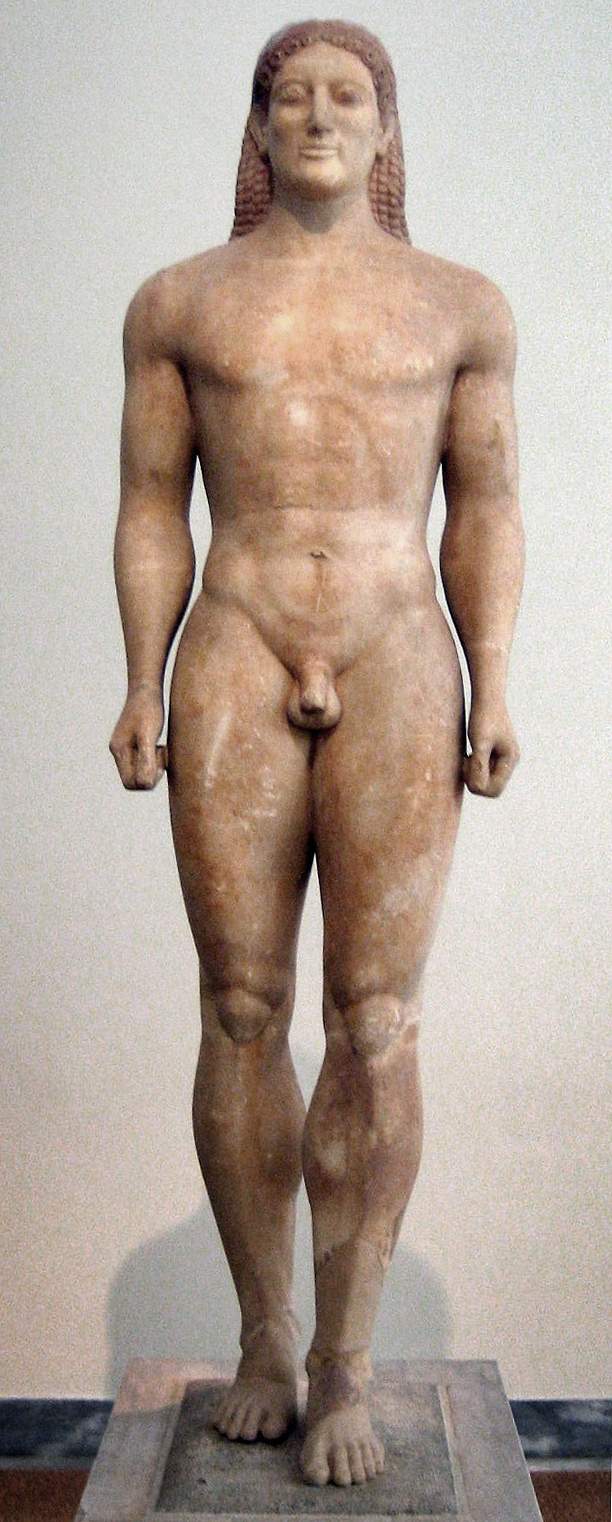
Unknown artist: Kouros Anavissos. National Archaeological Museum of Athens, c. 530 BC

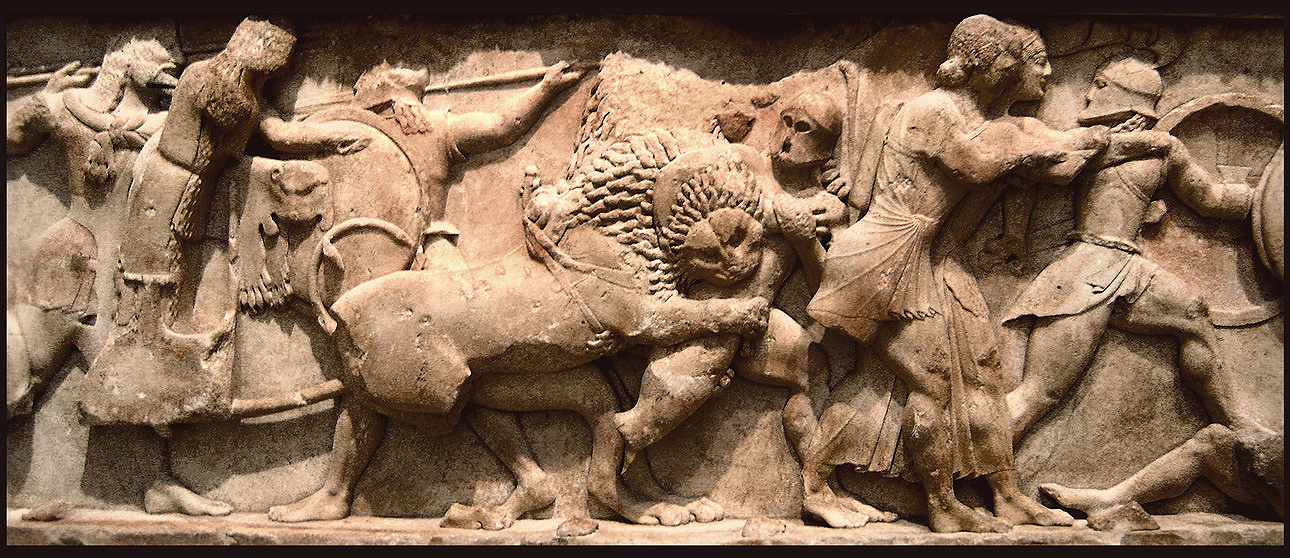
Unknown artist: Treasury of Siphnos frieze (detail), Delphi Archaeological Museum, c. 525 BC

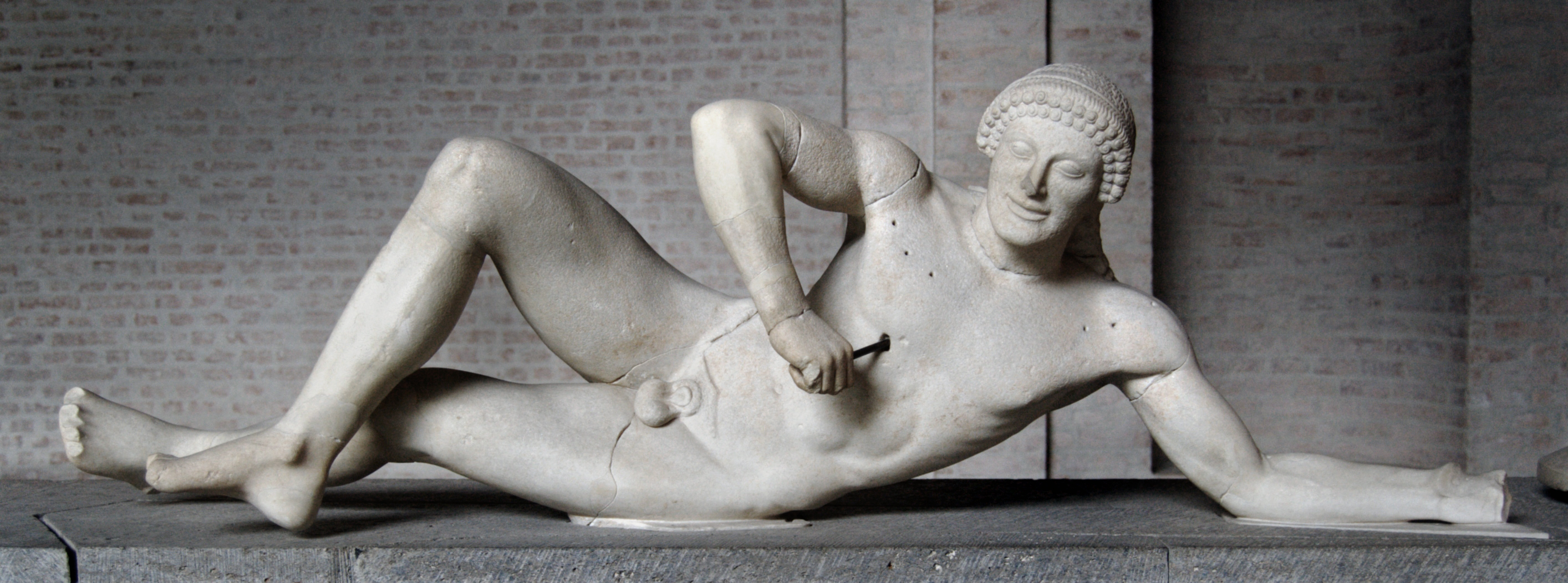
Attributed by some to Onatas or his school: Fallen Trojan warrior, figure W-VII of the west pediment of the Temple of Aphaia, Glyptothek, Munich, c. 505–500 BC

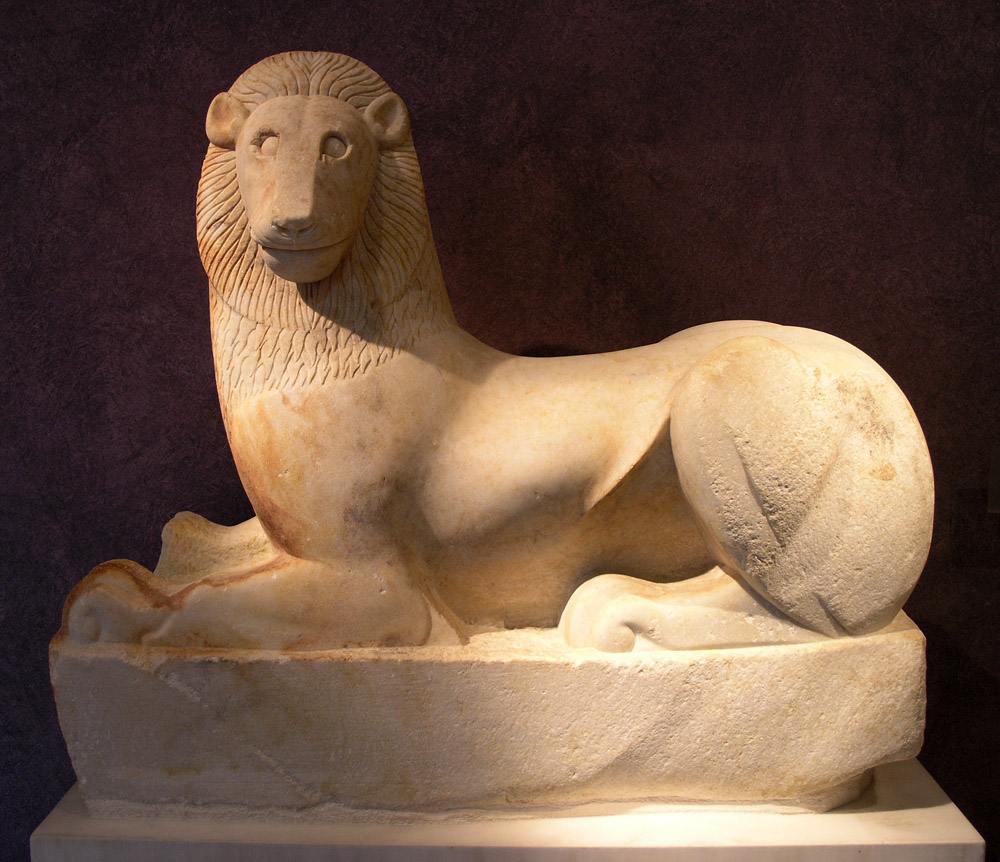
Unknown artist: Funerary lion found at the Sacred Gate at the Kerameikon. Kerameikos Archaeological Museum, Athens, c. 590–580 BC

=== Classical period ===
The Classical period saw changes in both the style and function of sculpture. Poses became more naturalistic (see the Charioteer of Delphi for an example of the transition to more naturalistic sculpture), and the technical skill of Greek sculptors in depicting the human form in a variety of poses greatly increased. From about 500 BC statues began to depict real people. The statues of Harmodius and Aristogeiton were erected in Athens to celebrate the assassination of the last Peisistratid tyrant, Hipparchus. They were said to be the first public monuments to depict actual people.

As Greek artists began to study human movement and anatomy, they discovered that living humans tend to display a "weight shift" or contraposition when standing.

The first Greek statue to exhibit contrapposto is the famed Kritios Boy, dating c. 480 BC. Contrapposto soon became a defining element of Greek sculptural technique, culminating in Polykleitos' Canon. The Canon is a theoretical work that discusses ideal mathematical proportions for the parts of the human body and proposes for sculpture of the human figure a dynamic counterbalance—between the relaxed and tensed body parts and between the directions in which the parts move. Polykleitos sought to prove the accuracy of his calculations by implementing his rules in a statue simply entitled: The Canon. Though the statue itself is lost to history, its principles manifest themselves in the Doryphoros ("spear-bearer"), which adopted extremely dynamic and sophisticated contrapposto in its cross-balance of rigid and loose limbs.

Greek temples were specially made to fit the large cult statues. They believed that placing shrines around the areas that were said to be holy would please the gods. During the classical period, sculptors were not only creating works for temples, but also mortuary statues to show tribute to deceased loved ones. The sculptures would often show the deceased person in a relaxed pose. Successful athletes and rich families would commission statues of themselves for temples to show respect to the gods. In the 5th century BC, portraits became popular and busts featuring generals, philosophers and political leaders appeared.

The high quality of Greek work attracted Italian interest, and greatly influenced both Etruscan, and later, Roman art. The enthusiasm with which Rome greeted Greek art has proven important not merely because of the transmission of classical Greek style, but also because most of the extant classical Greek works survive mainly in the form of Roman marble copies of Greek bronze originals. As bronze has always been a valuable metal, most of the originals were likely long ago melted down, and the few genuine survivals have been found by mostly in the context of shipwrecks.

However, Greeks did carve marble, and a number of classical Greek marbles have survived; the famed Parthenon Marbles (also known as the Elgin Marbles), lasted in situ until the beginning of the 19th Century. In fact, many of the surviving classical Greek marbles are from an architectural context.

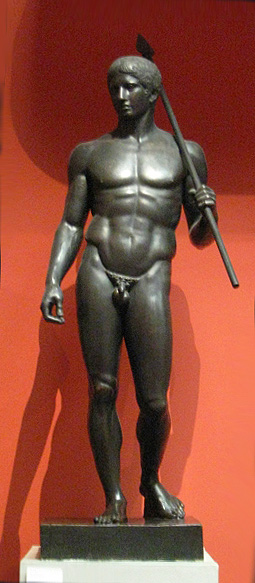
Polykleitos: Doryphoros. Cast in Pushkin Museum, Moscow.

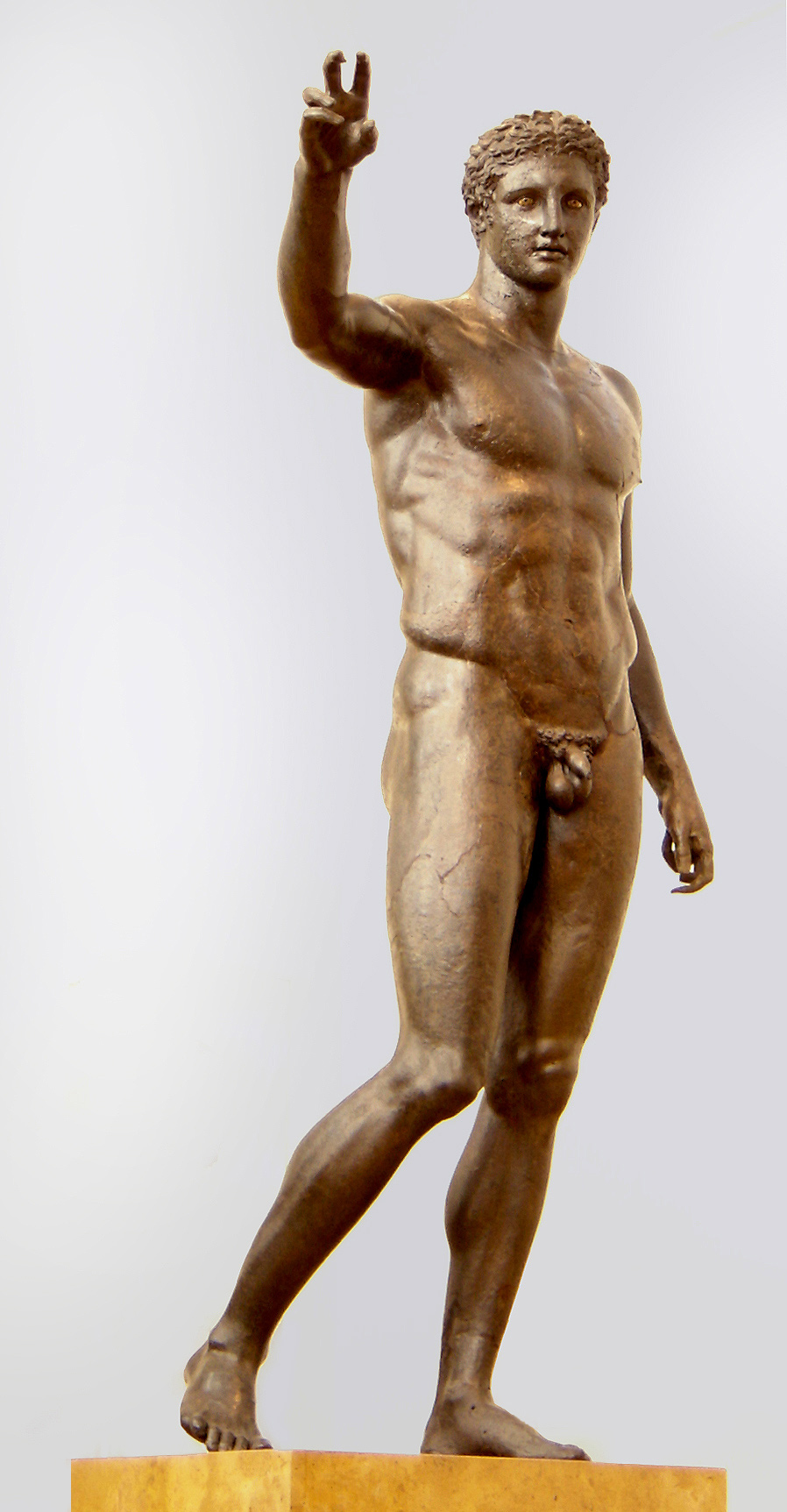
Attributed to Euphranor: Paris or Perseus. Atikythera shipwreck, c. 340–330 BC. National Archaeological Museum, Athens.

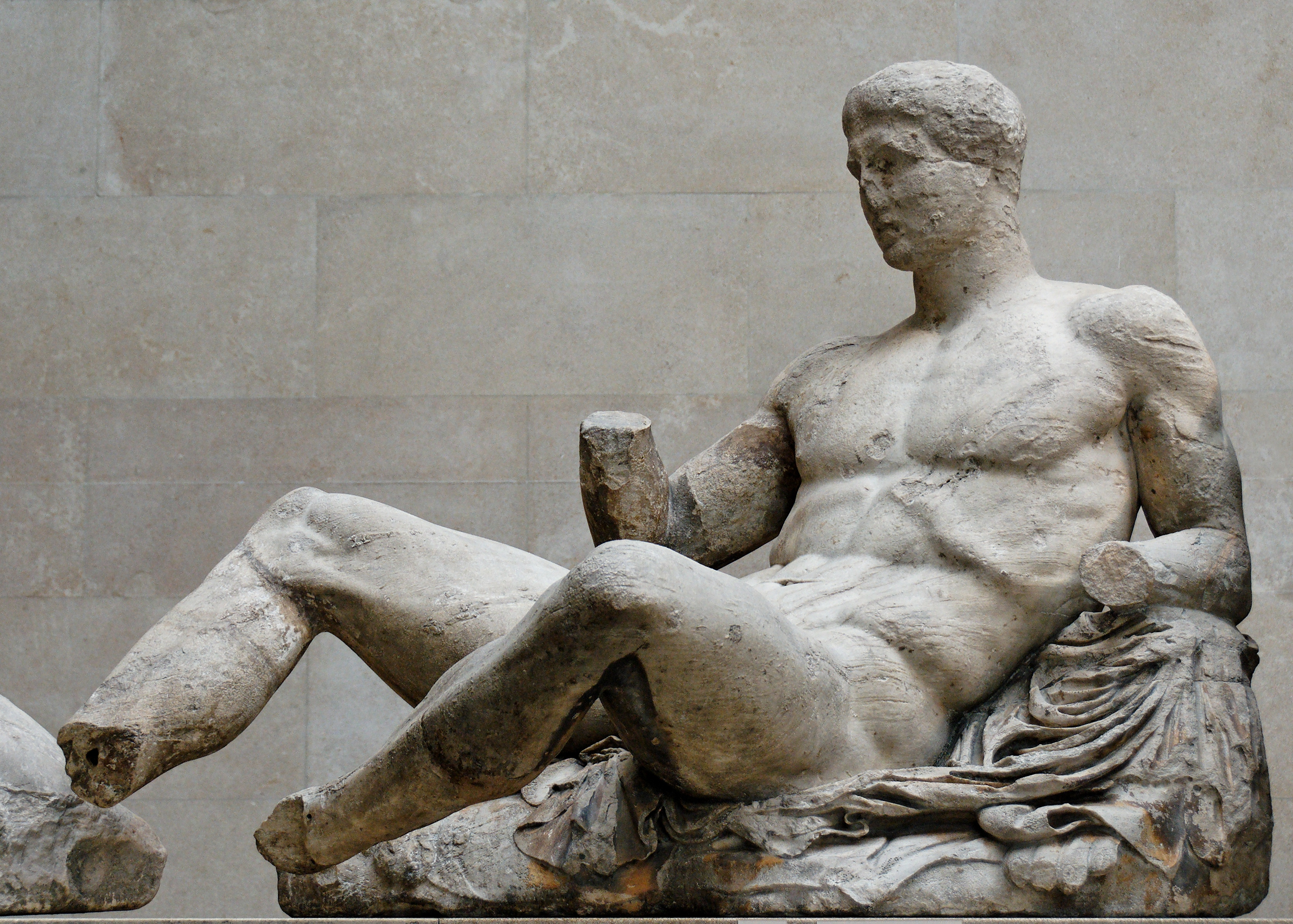
Phidias' workshop: Reclining Dionysos, from Parthenon east pediment, ca. 447–433 BC. British Museum

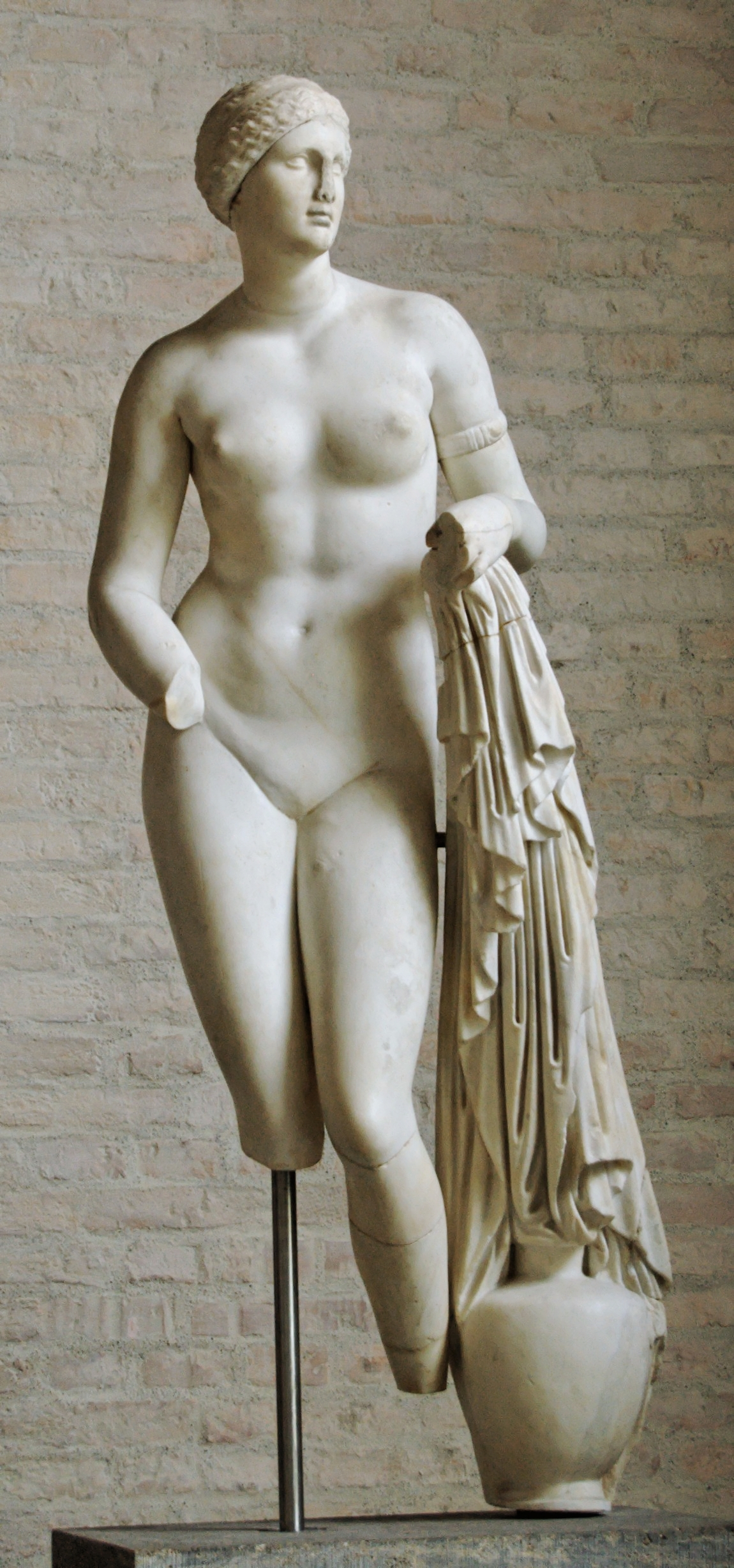
Aphrodite Braschi, free copy (1st century BC) after a votive statue of Praxitele in Cnidus (Aphrodite of Cnidus type, c. 350–340 BC). Glyptothek, Munich

=== Hellenistic period ===
The transition from the Classical to the Hellenistic period occurred during the 4th century BC. Sculpture became more and more naturalistic. Common people, women, children, animals and domestic scenes became acceptable subjects for sculpture, which was commissioned by wealthy families for the adornment of their homes and gardens. Realistic portraits of men and women of all ages were produced, and sculptors no longer felt obliged to depict people as ideals of beauty or physical perfection. Most Greek men were sculpted standing with their hips slightly to the side. When human beings stand this way it uses more muscles.

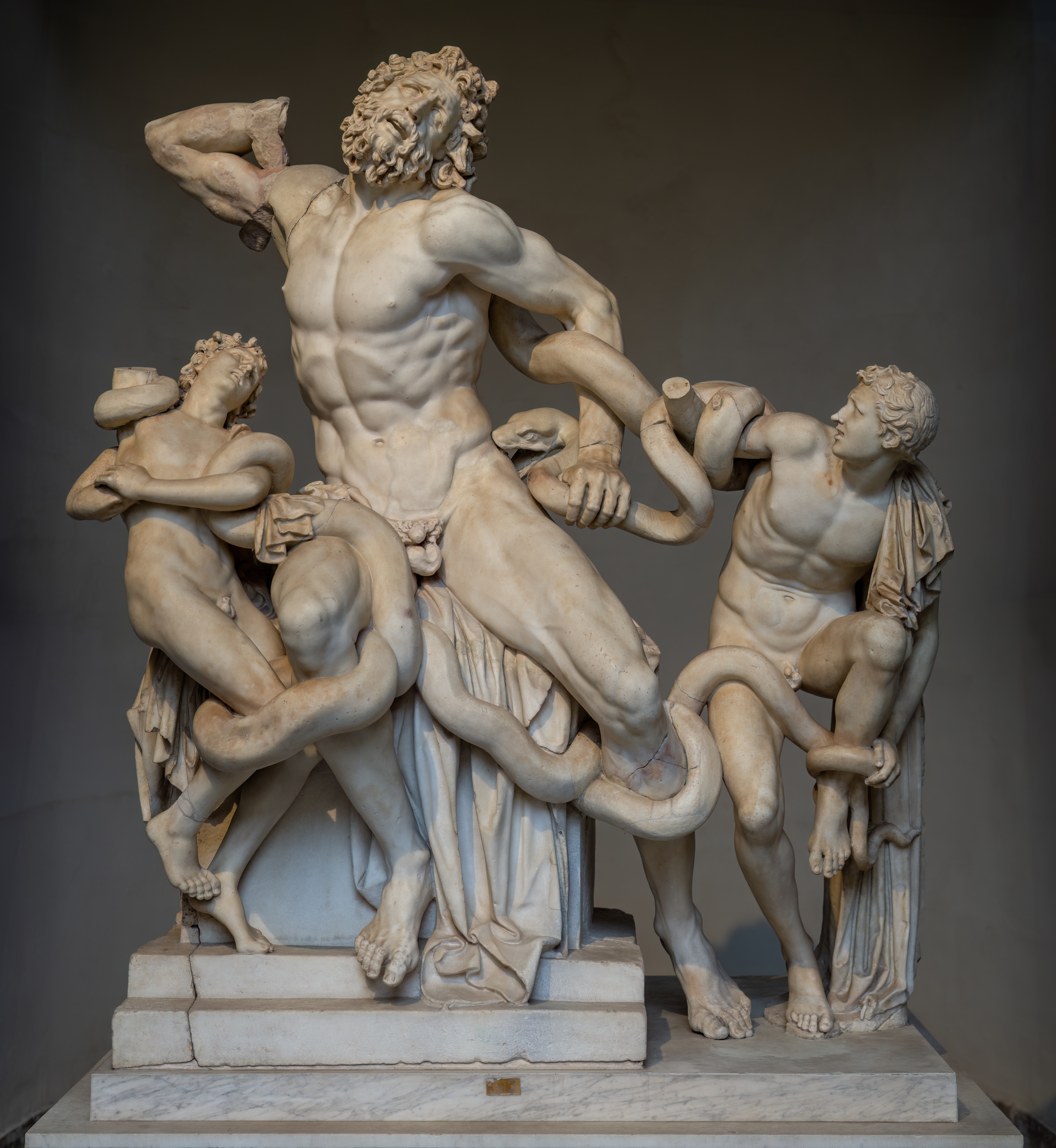
Attributed by Pliny the Elder to Agesander, Athanodoros and Polydorus: Laocoön and His Sons. Copy after an Hellenistic original from ca. 200 BC. Vatican Museums

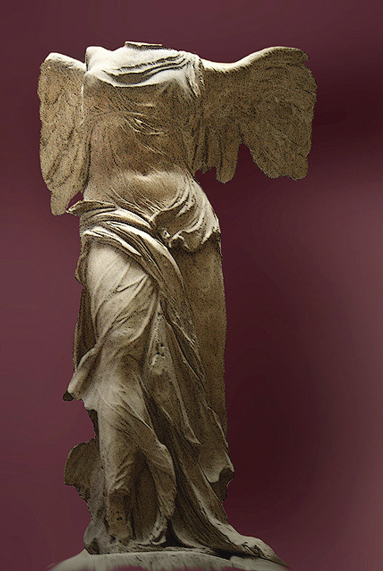
Unknown artist: Nike of Samothrace, c. 220–190 BC. Louvre

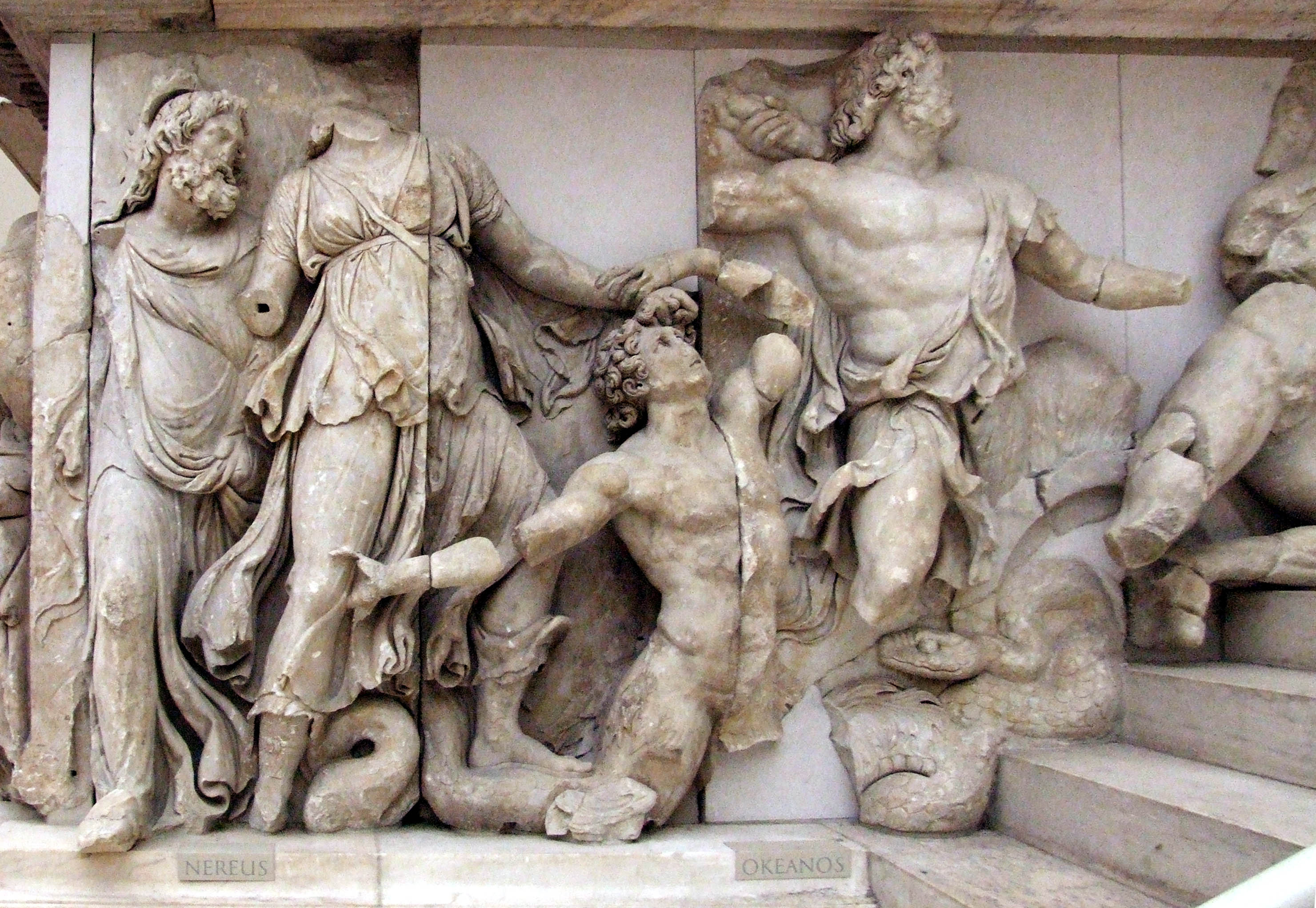
Unknown artist: Nereus, Doris, a giant, Oceanus, from the Pergamon Altar (detail), 2nd century BC. Pergamonmuseum, Berlin

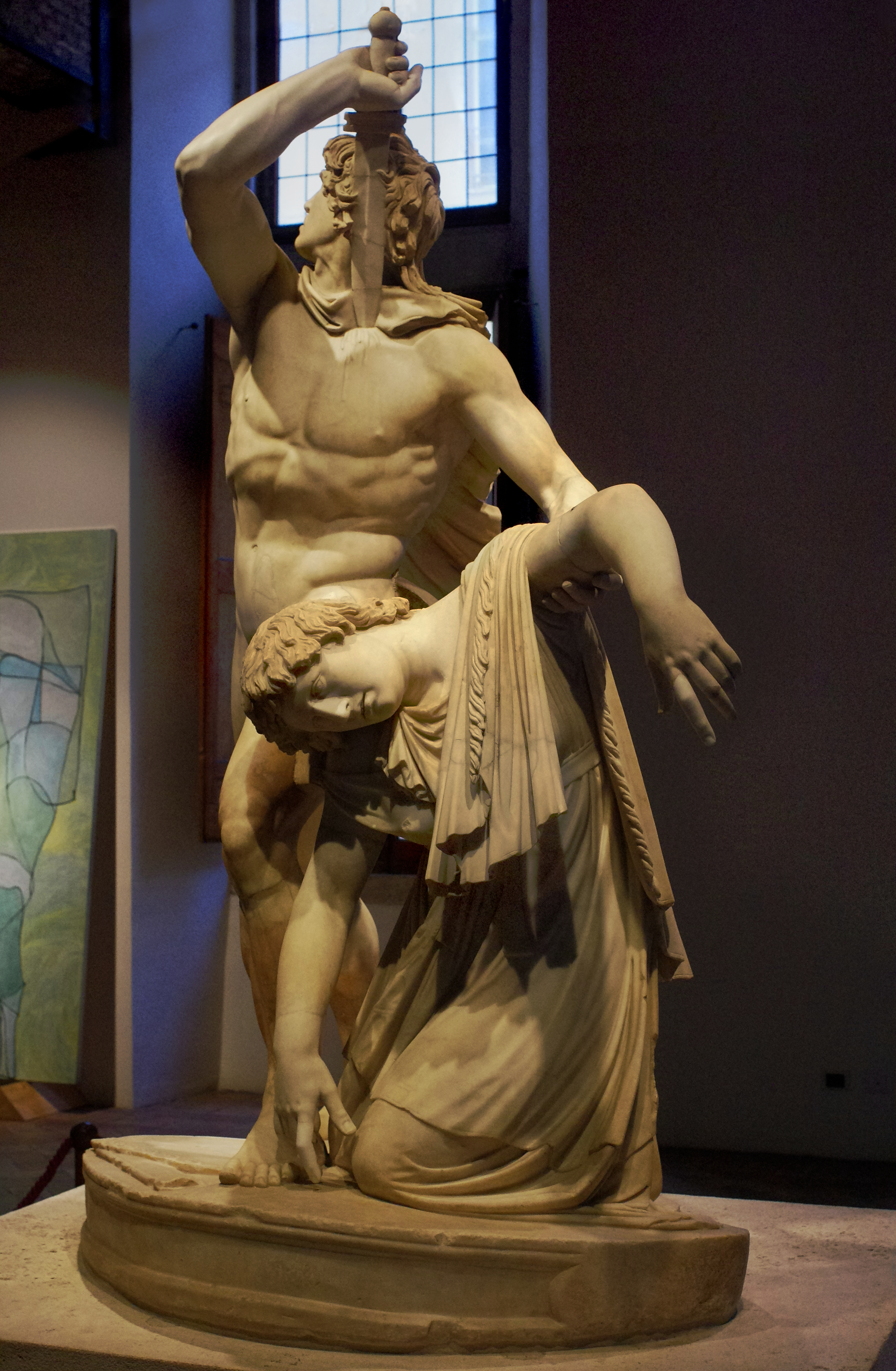
Unknown artist: Ludovisi Gaul and his wife. Roman copy after an Hellenistic original from a monument built by Attalus I of Pergamon after his victory over Gauls, ca. 220 BC. Palazzo Altemps, Rome

== Roman sculpture ==
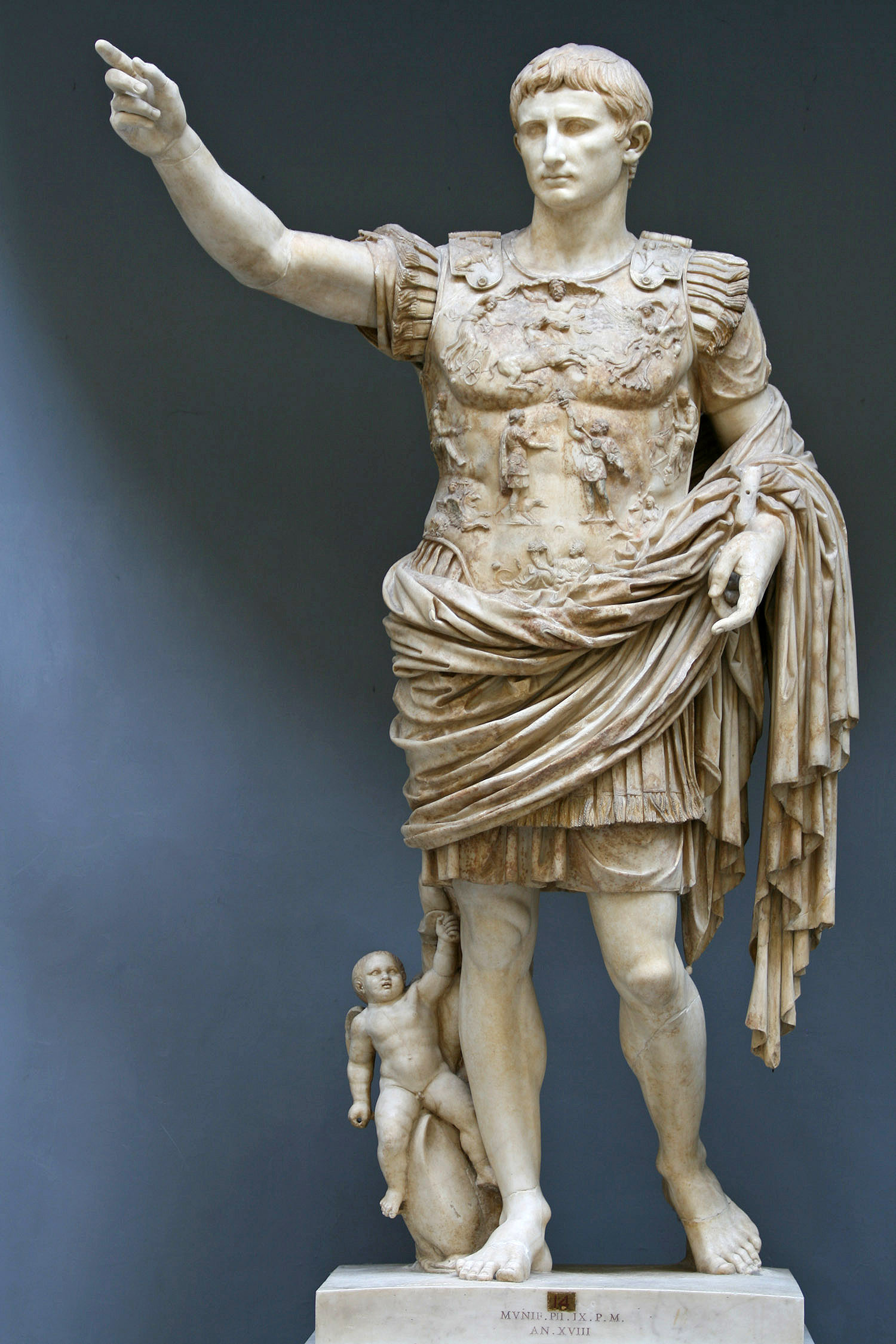
Augustus of Prima Porta, statue of the emperor Augustus, 1st century. Vatican Museums

The study of Roman sculpture is complicated by its relation to Greek sculpture. Many examples of even the most famous Greek sculptures, such as the Apollo Belvedere and Barberini Faun, are known only from Roman Imperial or Hellenistic "copies". At one time, this imitation was taken by art historians as indicating a narrowness of the Roman artistic imagination, but, in the late 20th century, Roman art began to be reevaluated on its own terms: some impressions of the nature of Greek sculpture may in fact be based on Roman artistry.

The strengths of Roman sculpture are in portraiture, where they were less concerned with the ideal than the Greeks or Ancient Egyptians, and produced very characterful works, and in narrative relief scenes. Examples of Roman sculpture are abundantly preserved, in total contrast to Roman painting, which was very widely practised but has almost all been lost. Latin and some Greek authors, particularly Pliny the Elder in Book 34 of his Natural History, describe statues, and a few of these descriptions match extant works. While a great deal of Roman sculpture, especially in stone, survives more or less intact, it is often damaged or fragmentary; life-size bronze statues are much more rare as most have been recycled for their metal.

Most statues were actually far more lifelike and often brightly coloured when originally created; the raw stone surfaces found today is due to the pigment being lost over the centuries.

=== Portraits ===
Portraiture is a dominant genre of Roman sculpture, growing perhaps from the traditional Roman emphasis on family and ancestors; the entrance hall (atrium) of a Roman elite house displayed ancestral portrait busts. During the Roman Republic, it was considered a sign of character not to gloss over physical imperfections, and to depict men in particular as rugged and unconcerned with vanity: the portrait was a map of experience. During the Imperial era, more idealized statues of Roman emperors became ubiquitous, particularly in connection with the state religion of Rome. Tombstones of even the modestly rich middle class sometimes exhibit portraits of the otherwise unknown deceased carved in relief.

== Colour ==
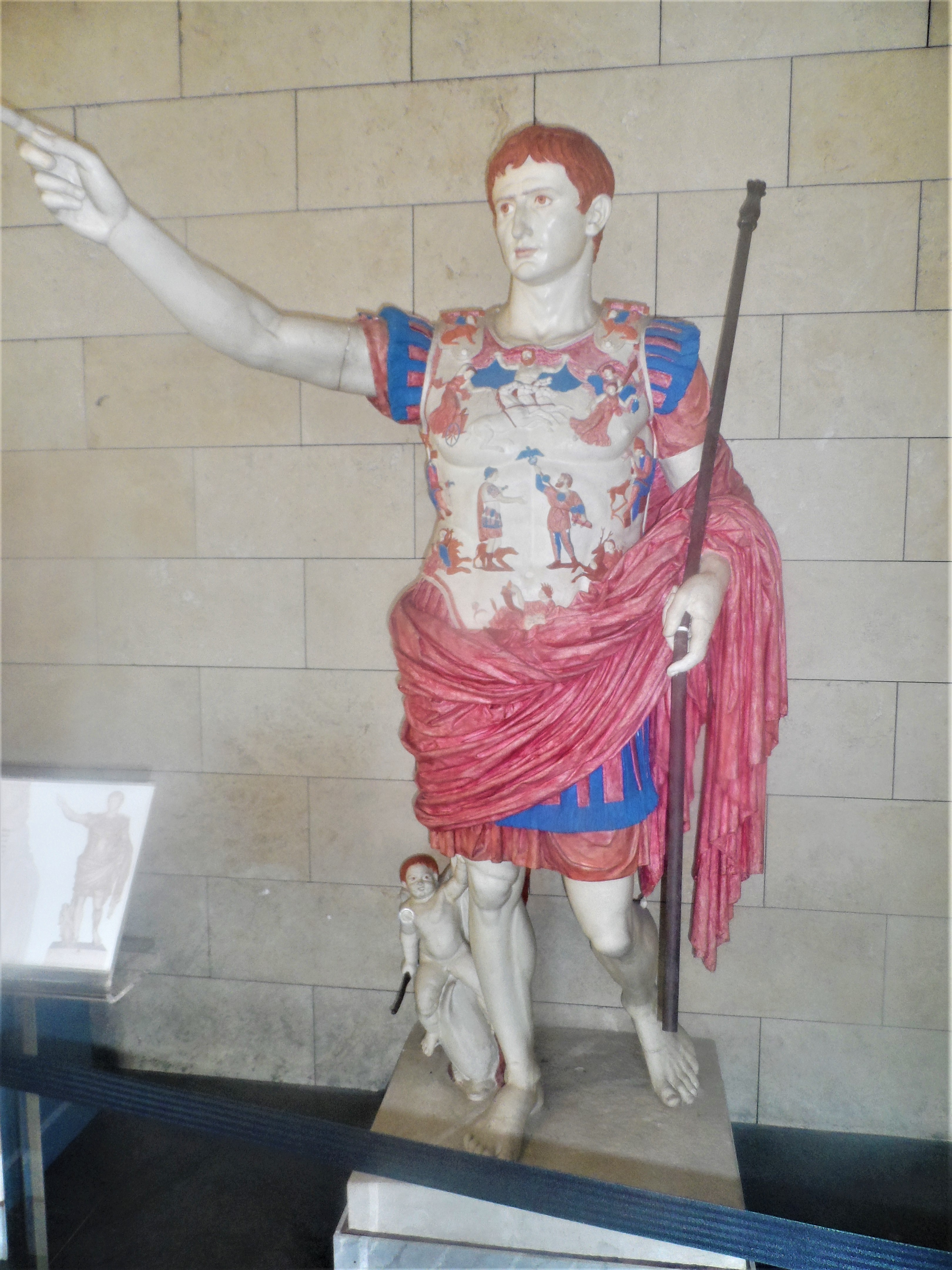
Modern imagining of how classical statue may have been coloured (Vatican Museum)

Ancient statues and bas-reliefs survive showing the bare surface of the material of which they are made, and people generally associate classical art with white marble sculpture. But there is evidence that many statues were painted in bright colours. Most of the colour was weathered off over time. Small remnants were removed during cleaning as well. In some cases small traces remained, however, that could be identified. A travelling exhibition of 20 coloured replicas of Greek and Roman works, alongside 35 original statues and reliefs, was held in Europe and the United States during 2007–2008, Gods in Color: Painted Sculpture of Classical Antiquity. Details such as whether the paint was applied in one or two coats, how finely the pigments were ground, or exactly which binding medium would have been used in each case—all elements that would affect the appearance of a finished piece—are not known.

== Influence ==
Greco-Roman sculpture had a profound influence on Western art. With it, the Greco-Roman style established the possibility and potential of realism in art. Because of the relative durability of sculpture, it has managed to survive and continue to influence and inform artists in varying cultures and eras, from Europe to Asia, and today, the whole world.

While classical art gradually fell into disfavor in Europe after the fall of the Western Roman Empire, its rediscovery during the early Italian Renaissance proved decisive. One of the most important sculptors in the classical revival was Donatello. Many other sculptors such as Michelangelo also made works which can be considered classical. Modern Classicism contrasted in many ways with the classical sculpture of the 19th Century which was characterized by commitments to naturalism (Antoine-Louis Barye) – the melodramatic (François Rude) sentimentality (Jean-Baptiste Carpeaux) – or a kind of stately grandiosity (Lord Leighton) Several different directions in the classical tradition were taken as the century turned, but the study of the live model and the post-Renaissance tradition was still fundamental to them.

== See also ==
- Ancient Greek art
