= Jockey of Artemision =

Hellenistic bronze statue

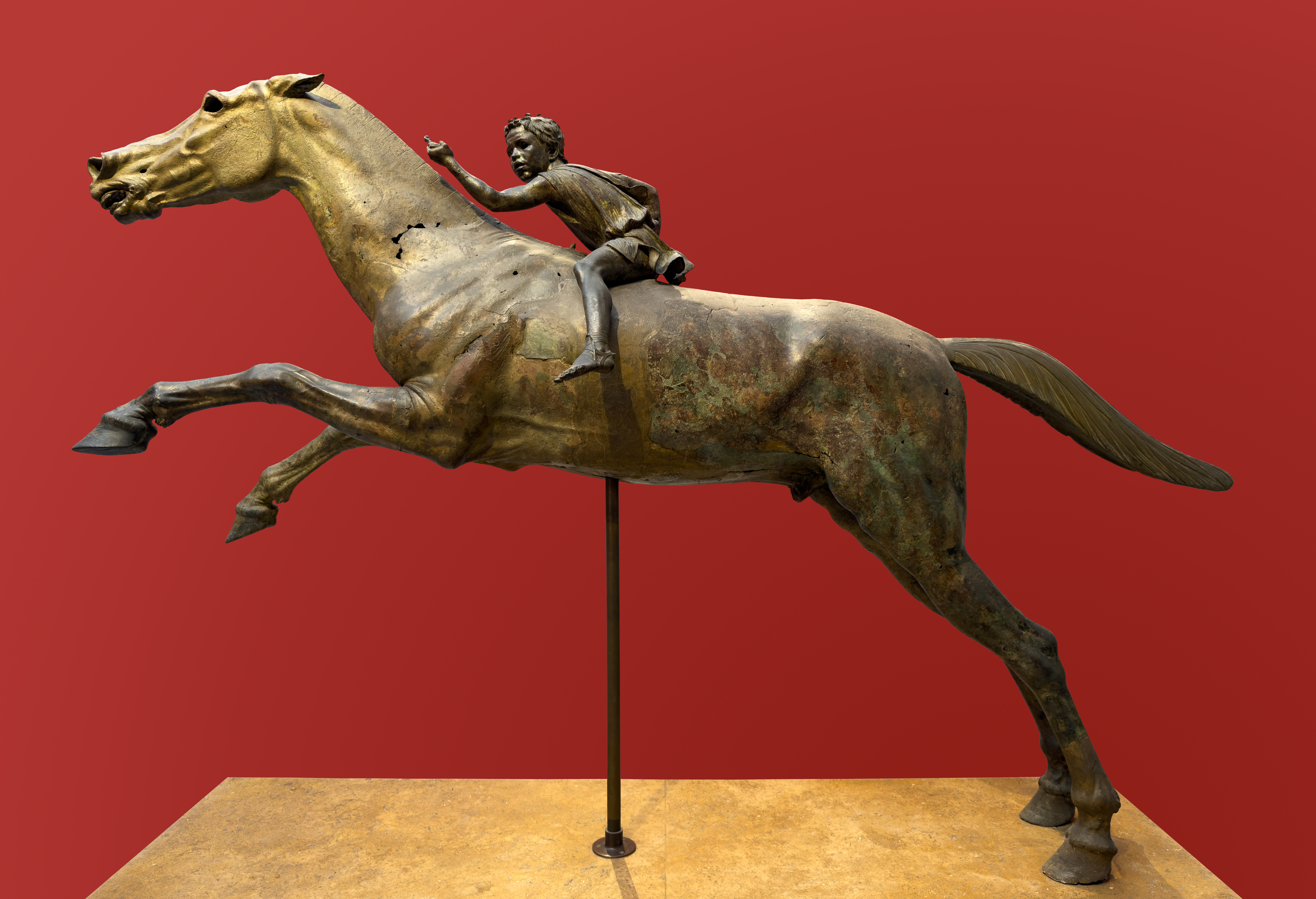
- Material: Bronze
- Size: height: 2.1 meters length: 2.9 meters
- Height: 2.1 meters
- Created: 150 – 140 BC
- Discovered: 1926; Aegean Sea, Mediterranean Sea
- Present location: Athens, Attica, Greece

The Jockey of Artemision is a large Hellenistic bronze statue of a young boy riding a horse, dated to around 150–140 BC. It is a rare surviving original bronze statue from Ancient Greece and a rare example in Greek sculpture of a racehorse. Most ancient bronzes were melted down for their raw materials sometime after creation, but this one was saved from destruction when it was lost in a shipwreck in antiquity, before being discovered in 1926. It may have been dedicated to the gods by a wealthy person to honour victories in horse races, probably in the single-horse race (Greek: κέλης - kēles). The artist is unknown.

== Discovery and display ==
The statue was found in a shipwreck off Cape Artemision, in north Euboea, which was discovered in 1926. Also found in the wreck were parts of the Artemision Bronze. The first parts of the equestrian statue were recovered in 1928, with more pieces found in 1936 and/or 1937. The statue was reassembled, after restoration of the horse's tail and body, and it went on display at the National Archaeological Museum, Athens in 1972.

== Origins ==
The original artist and the circumstances under which the work was created are unknown. However, Seán Hemingway has suggested that it may have been plundered from Corinth in 146 BC by the Roman general Mummius in the Achaean War and given to Attalus but lost while in transit to Pergamon.

== Design and construction ==
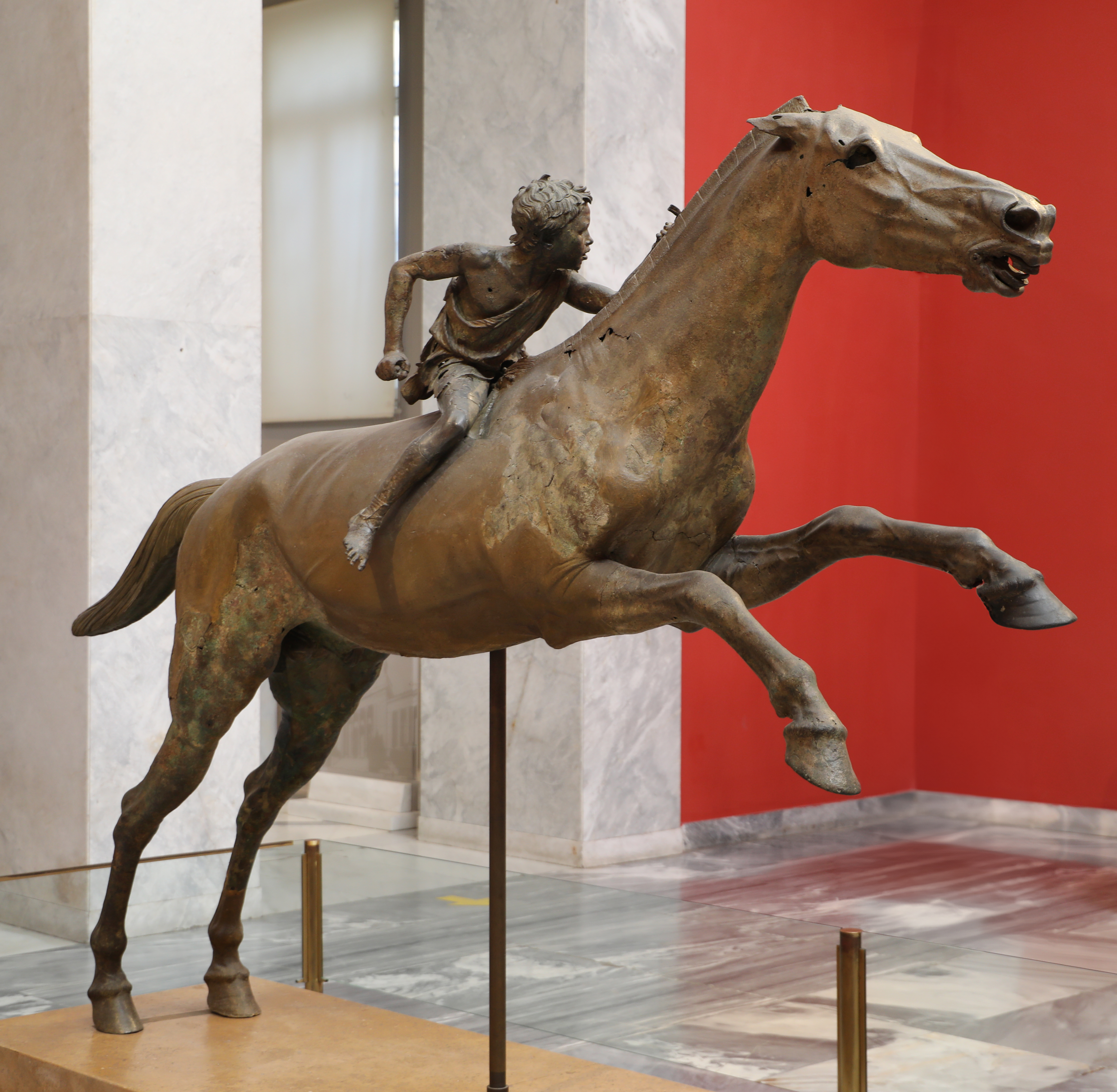
Jockey of Artemision, alternate view

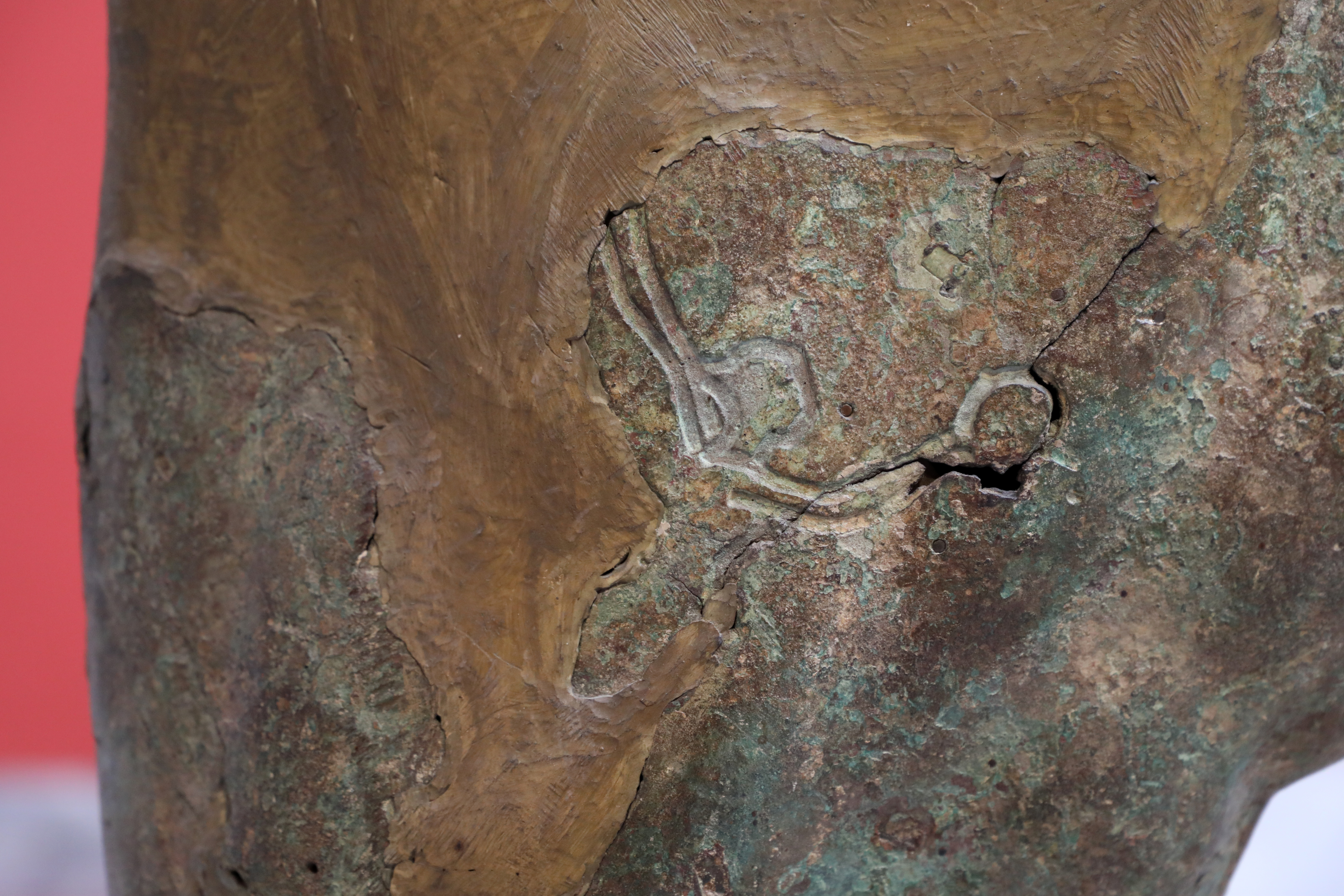
Nike on the side of the horse

The equestrian statue is approximately life-size, with a length of 2.9 metres (9.5 ft) and 2.1 metres (6.9 ft) high. It was cast in pieces using an indirect lost wax process and then assembled with flow welding. Some parts are missing, such as the rider's whip and reins, and the horse's bridle. The horse and its rider are rendered realistically, as if captured as the horse springs away in mid-gallop, with its rear feet on the ground and its front legs raised. The bronze of the rear legs is thicker, indicating that they were the statue's primary means of support. The image of the goddess Nike is engraved on the horse's right thigh, holding a wreath in raised hands—a brand for racehorses in Ancient Greece. The horse dwarfs its jockey, a boy only 84 centimetres (2.76 ft) tall and perhaps 10 years old, possibly from Africa based on his physiognomy and original black patinated surface colouring. His hairstyle, however, is Greek, suggesting a mixed heritage. He rides bareback without a saddle. He wears sandals and a short chiton, and looks back over his left shoulder.

== See also ==
- Charioteer of Delphi, a 5th-century bronze
