= Thaumacia =

Coordinates: 39°11′30″N 23°20′35″E

Thaumacia or Thaumakie (Ancient Greek: Θαυμακία or Θαυμακίη) was a town of Magnesia in ancient Thessaly, one of the four cities whose ships are listed by Homer in the Catalogue of Ships in the Iliad as commanded by Philoctetes during the Trojan War. It was said to have been founded by Thaumacus, the father of Poeas. Strabo located it on the same stretch of coast where Olizon and Meilboea stood. It is also mentioned by Pliny the Elder among the cities of Magnesia.

Its location is tentatively placed at a site called Theotokou near Liri.
