= Cape St. George (Greece) =

Promontory

Coordinates: 39°29′57″N 23°05′47″E

Cape St. George (Greek: Άκρα Αγίου Γεωργίου), called Sepias in antiquity (Ancient Greek: Σηπιάς; Latin: Sepias promontorium), is a promontory of Magnesia. Sepias was also the name of a nearby town.

It is celebrated in Greek mythology as the spot where Peleus laid in wait for Thetis, and from whence he carried off the goddess, and in history as the scene of the great shipwreck of the fleet of Xerxes I just before the Battle of Thermopylae in 480 BCE; many ancient authors cite it. Some other ships of Xerxes' fleet crashed near Meliboea.
