= Dimitriad =

Dimitriad can refer to:

- Polish–Muscovite War (1605–1618), also known as the Dimitriads
- Demetrias or Demetriada, a community near the Greek city of Volos, founded around 3rd century BC by Demetrius Poliorcetes.
