= Thaumacus (mythology) =

In Greek mythology, Thaumacus was the founder of Thaumacia in Magnesia, Thessaly

In Greek mythology, Thaumacus (Ancient Greek: Θαύμακος) was the founder of Thaumacia in Magnesia, Thessaly. He was the father of King Poeas of Meliboea (or Malis), the father of Philoctetes.
