= Boudeion =

Budium /bjuːˈdaɪəm/ (Ancient Greek: Βούδειον Boúdeion) or Budea /bjuːˈdiːə/ (Βούδεια Boúdeia) was a town of Magnesia in ancient Thessaly, mentioned by Homer in the Iliad. Apparently, there was a cult of Athena Boudeia at the town.

The site of Budium is unlocated.
