= Euryampos =

Euryampos (Ancient Greek: Εὐρύαμπος) or Euryampion (Εὐρύαμπίον) was a town of Magnesia in ancient Thessaly.

Its site is unlocated.
