= Spalathra =

Coordinates: 39°11′25″N 23°13′03″E

Map showing ancient Thessaly. Spalathra is shown to the far right on the Pagasetic Gulf.

Spalathra (Ancient Greek: Σπάλαθρα) or Spalauthra (Σπάλαυθρα), also called Spalethre (Σπαλέθρη) and Spalathron (Σπάλαθρον), was a town and polis (city-state) of Magnesia, in ancient Thessaly, upon the Pagasetic Gulf. It is conjectured that this town is meant by Lycophron, who describes Prothous, the leader of the Magnetes in the Iliad, as ὁ ἐκ Παλαύθρων (Σπαλαύθρων). The town is also mentioned in the Periplus of Pseudo-Scylax as a city in Magnesia, together with Iolcus, Coracae, Methone and Olizon.

The toponym is related to the Greek word "σπάλαθρον", meaning fire poker. Perhaps from the shape of the peninsula on which it sat.

Spalathra was located within the limits of modern Chorto.
