= Coracae =

Town and polis in ancient Thessaly

Coracae or Korakai (Ancient Greek: Κορακαί) was a town and polis (city-state) on the Pagasetic Gulf in Magnesia in ancient Thessaly. It is mentioned in the Periplus of Pseudo-Scylax as between Methone and Spalauthra. Earlier writers tried to equate the town with Korope, but that has not been generally accepted.

Coracae is noted in two inscriptions from Delphi of the fourth century BCE. It has been suggested that the town's location could have been on a hill called Nevestiki, near the current village of Lekonas, where remains of a fortification have been found, but that location has been suggested by others as the site of Methone.
