= Goritsa (Greece) =

Archaeological site in Greece

- Γορίτσα (Ancient Greek)
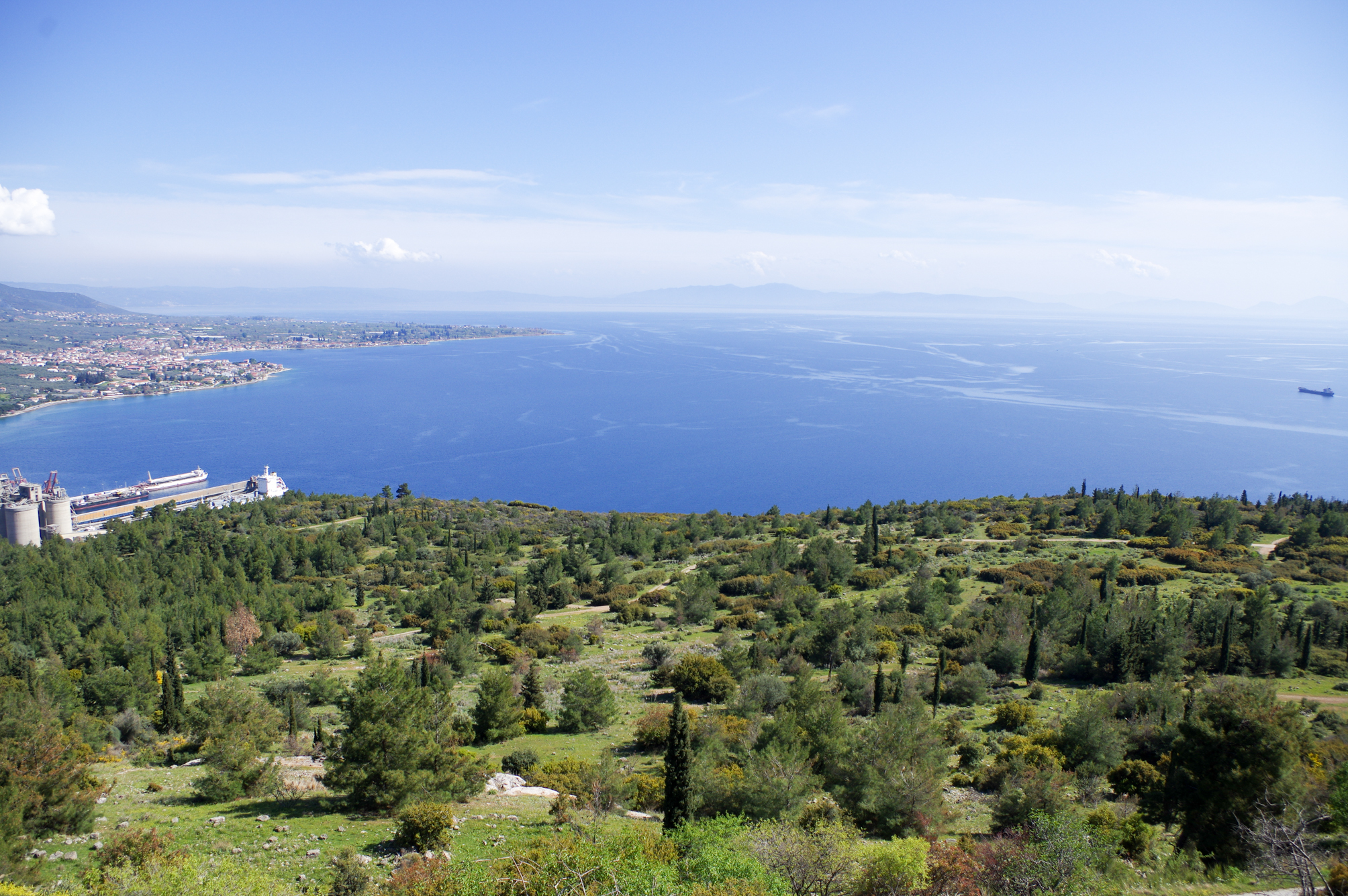
- The archaeological site of Goritsa

- Location within Greece
- 39°21′14″N 22°58′37″E
- Type: Ancient city
- Periods: Classical period
- Cultures: Ancient Greece
- Location: Goritsa, Volos
- Region: Magnesia, Thessaly, Greece
- Part of: Ancient Magnesia

Site notes
- Archaeologists: S. C. Bakhuizen
- Website: odysseus.culture.gr/h/3/eh355.jsp?obj_id=2674

Goritsa is a hill and an archaeological site in Volos, Greece, immediately east of the city centre. It was examined in the early 1970s by a Dutch team of archaeologists, revealing a planned ancient city with a regular street grid covering most of the hill.
