= Cercinium =

Coordinates: 39°37′27″N 22°41′07″E

Cercinium or Kerkineion (Ancient Greek: Κερκινείον) or Kerkinion (Κερκινέον) was a town in Magnesia, in ancient Thessaly, near the Lake Boebeis.

The site of Cercinium is located at a place called Ano Amygdali.
