= Glaphyrae =

Ancient Greek city in Thessaly

Coordinates: 39°26′38″N 22°53′00″E

Map showing ancient Thessaly. Glaphyrae is shown to the centre right, in Magnesia, south of the lake.

Glaphyrae (Ancient Greek: Γλαφυραί) was a town of Magnesia in ancient Thessaly, mentioned by Homer in the Catalogue of Ships along with Boebe and Iolcus After which, the name does not subsequently occur in history. William Martin Leake wrote that the town is represented by the Hellenic ruins situated upon one of the hills above the modern village of Glafira (formerly called Kapourna), between Boebe and Iolcus. This identification is accepted by modern scholars. As of Leake's visit in the 19th century, the entire circuit of the citadel on the summit of the hill could be traced, and on its lower side part of the wall was still standing.
