= Ex voto of the Tarentines =

One of the important ex votos of the Greek cities in the sanctuary of Delphi was the bronze sculpted ex voto of the Italian city of Tarentum in commemoration of their victory against the Messapians.

== Description ==
As the visitor moves along the Sacred Way, having on the left hand side the eastern side of the Polygonal wall, one sees the remains of a row of famous monuments. The first one, according to Pausanias, was the base where stood the ex votos of the Tarentines: it consisted of the bronze statues of a dolphin, of the Lacaedemonian hero Phalanthus and of the eponymous hero Taras, son of Poseidon, as well as of some other figures not mentioned specifically by Pausanias. The latter, however, mentions the foundation myth of Tarentum, according to which an oracle from Delphi had predicted that the Lacaedemonians, on their way to Italy, would found a city when there would be rain in clear weather. Phalanthus, leader of the expedition, was hopeless, as no matter how many efforts he made he could not prevail among the locals and get a piece of land to found his colony. His wife, who was called Aethra (=clear weather) would take him in her arms and cry over his head out of compassion for her husband. Phalanthus, then, realized the meaning of the oracle and attacked Taras right away, in the middle of the night, thus managing to capture the city. The ex voto was made by the famous sculptors Onatas from Aegina and Ageladas from Argos and dates to the beginning of the 5th century B.C. Behind the monument stands a base with a circular plinth, where the citizens of Croton in Southern Italy had erected a tripod, dating possibly also to the same period.
