= Korope =

Coordinates: 39°18′35″N 23°06′26″E

Korope (Ancient Greek: Κορόπη) was an ancient Greek town of Magnesia, located in the region of Thessaly, with a site sacred to Apollo. Its site is identified as near modern Margarania.

== Sources ==
- Hansen, Mogens Herman; Nielsen, Thomas Heine (2004). An Inventory of Archaic and Classical Poleis. Oxford and New York: Oxford University Press. ISBN 0198140991.
