= Methone (Thessaly) =

Map showing ancient Thessaly. Methone is shown to the far right on the Pagasetic Gulf.

Methone (Ancient Greek: Μεθώνη, Methṓnē) was an ancient Greek city-state on the Pagasetic Gulf of Magnesia in ancient Thessaly. The town is mentioned by Homer in the Catalogue of Ships in the Iliad as belonging to Philoctetes. It is also mentioned in the Periplus of Pseudo-Scylax as a city in Magnesia, together with Iolcus, Coracae, Spalauthra and Olizon.

Some accept that the town's location is on a hill called Nevestiki (39°19′54″N 23°03′10″E), near the current village of Ano Lechonia, where remains of a fortification have been found, but that location has been suggested by others as the site of Coracae.
