= Carol Mattusch =

American art historian

Carol C. Mattusch

Academic background
- Education: Bryn Mawr College

Academic work
- Discipline: Art History
- Institutions: George Mason University

Carol C. Mattusch is the Mathay Professor of Art History at George Mason University. She is a specialist in Greek, Roman and 18th century art.

== Education ==
Mattusch studied at Bryn Mawr College, graduating in 1969. She received her PhD from the University of North Carolina at Chapel Hill in 1975.

== Career ==
Mattusch has taught at George Mason University since 1979. Her research focuses on Classical bronzes. She has undertaken a detailed study on the bronze statues from the Villa dei Papiri at Herculaneum.

Throughout her career she has curated several exhibitions. She curated The Fire of Hephaistos: Large Classical Bronzes from North American Collections (1996-7) at the Harvard University Art Museums, which exhibited 50 large Greek and Roman bronzes. She curated an exhibition at the National Gallery of Art entitled Pompeii and the Roman Villa: Art and Culture around the Bay of Naples in 2008–2009, which was repeated at the Los Angeles County Museum of Art in 2009. The exhibition included paintings, mosaics and artworks from the villa at Oplontis, Villa San Marco at Stabiae and the Villa dei Papiri at Herculaneum, as well as works from urban houses at Pompeii.

She won the Charles Rufus Morey Book Award (2006) from the College Art Association for The Villa dei Papiri at Herculaneum and the James R. Wiseman Book Award (1997) from the Archaeological Institute of America for Classical Bronzes. Mattusch was elected as a fellow of the Society of Antiquaries in 2009 and is a corresponding member of the Deutsches Archäologisches Institut. From 2013 she was President of the American Friends of Herculaneum.

Mattusch has held three fellowships at the National Gallery of Art's Center for Advanced Studies in the Visual Arts (CASVA), including and the Samuel H. Kress Foundation Paired Fellowship for Research in Conservation and Archaeology with Henry Lie (1997-1998) and the Paul Mellon Senior Fellowship (2005-2006).

== Selected publications ==
- Bronzeworkers in the Athenian Agora (1982).
- Greek Bronze Statuary: From the Beginnings through the Fifth Century B.C. (Cornell University Press, 1988)
- Classical Bronzes: The Art and Craft of Greek and Roman Statuary (Cornell University Press, 1996)
- The Fire of Hephaistos: Large Classical Bronzes from North American Collections, exhibition catalogue (Harvard University Art Museums, 1996)
- The Victorious Youth (J. Paul Getty Museum, 1997)
- The Villa dei Papiri at Herculaneum: Life and Afterlife of a Sculpture Collection (J. Paul Getty Museum, 2005)
- Pompeii and the Roman Villa, exhibition catalogue (National Gallery of Art, 2009)
