= Rhizus =

Ancient Town

Coordinates: 39°48′52″N 22°49′11″E

Rhizus may also refer to Ριζαίον on the Black Sea, modern Rize.

Map showing ancient Thessaly. Rhizus is shown to the upper right on the sea.

Rhizus or Rhizous (Greek: Ριζούς (ο)) was a town and polis of Magnesia in ancient Thessaly, whose inhabitants were transported by Demetrios Poliorketes to Demetrias upon the foundation of the latter city. According to Periplus of Pseudo-Scylax, Rhizus was outside the Pagasaean Gulf, on the exterior (Aegean) shore. In Strabo's time, it was a village dependent on Demetrias. Coins minted by Rhizus have been found, dated in the 4th century BCE.

The site of Rhizus is at the modern village of Tarsanas (Ταρσανάς).
