= Aeson (Thessaly) =

Ancient Greek town

Aeson or Aison (Ancient Greek: Αἰσών), also Aesonis or Aisonis (Αἰσώνίς), was a town of Magnesia in ancient Thessaly, the name of which is derived from Aeson, the father of Jason.
