= Nelia =

Map showing ancient Thessaly. Nelia is shown to the right near Demetrias.

Nelia or Neleia (Ancient Greek: Νηλία or Νήλεια) was a town of Magnesia in ancient Thessaly; Demetrias was situated between it and Iolcus. Strabo reports that when Demetrios Poliorketes founded Demetrias he moved the population of Nelia thither (293 BCE).

Some archaeologists have related Nelia to the remains found on the Goritsa hill, while other sources state its site is unlocated.
