= Aesion =

4th-century BC Greek orator

Aesion (Gr. Αισίων) was an Athenian orator, and a contemporary of Demosthenes, with whom he was educated. To what party he belonged during the Macedonian time is uncertain. When he was asked what he thought of the orators of his time, he said, that when he heard the other orators, he admired their beautiful and sublime conversations with the people, but that the speeches of Demosthenes, when read, excelled all others by their skillful construction and their power. Aristotle mentions a beautiful expression of Aesion.
