= Velika, Larissa =

Village in Greece

Coordinates: 39°46′N 22°51′E

Velika (Greek: Βελίκα) also known as Spitaki (Σπιτάκι), is a beach village of Melivoia municipal unit, Larissa regional unit, Greece.

Velika is a beautiful seaside village, which attracts many tourists in the summer. Numerous cultural and sporting events take place during the summer.
