= Aeson (Thrace) =

Aeson or Aison (Ancient Greek: Αἴσων) was a Greek town in ancient Thrace. It belonged to the Delian League as it appears in Athenian tribute registers between 454/3 and 429/8 BCE. These registers are the only evidence for Aeson's location in Thrace. It is possible that the Aeson River (which is identified with the modern Pelikas) of Macedonia mentioned by Plutarch is related. It has also been suggested that Aeson could be identified with Aesa.

Its site has not been located.
