= Artemisium =

Cape in Euboea, Greece

Coordinates: 39°0′45″N 23°13′37″E

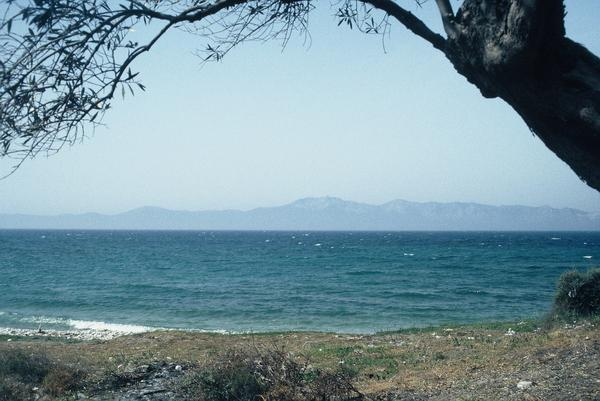
Beach at Cape Artemisium. Magnesia in the distance.

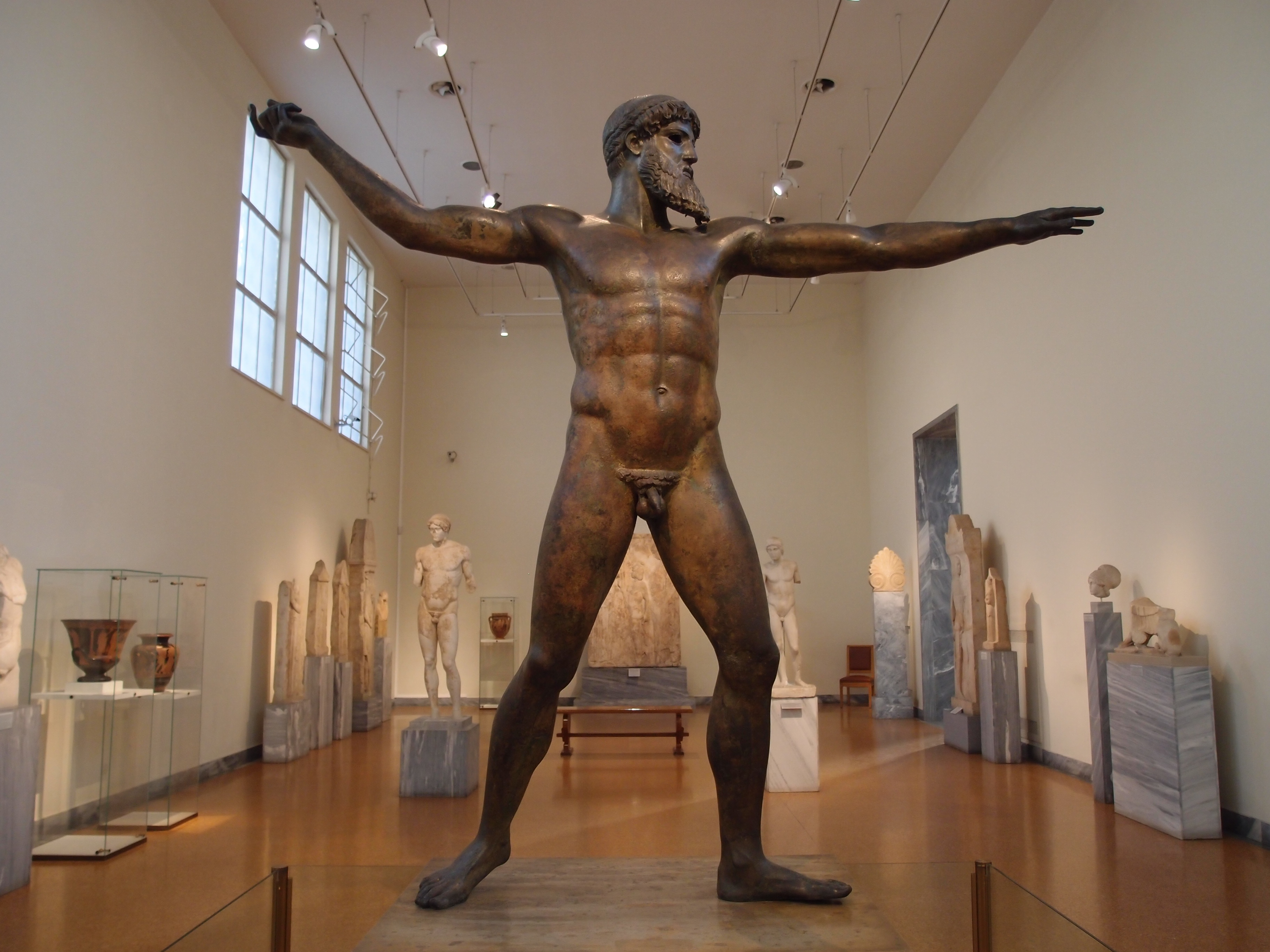
The Artemision Bronze, (National Archaeological Museum of Athens)

Artemisium or Artemision (Greek: Ἀρτεμίσιον) is a cape in northern Euboea, Greece. The hollow cast bronze statue of Zeus or Poseidon, known as the Artemision Bronze, was found off this cape in a sunken ship, as was the Jockey of Artemision, a bronze statue of a racehorse and its jockey.

The Battle of Artemisium, a series of naval engagements over three days during the second Persian invasion of Greece in 480 BC, simultaneously with the more famous land battle at Thermopylae, took place here. Part of the action of the film 300: Rise of an Empire was loosely based on this battle.

== Archaeology ==
In 1928, an Ancient Greek shipwreck at the site was found containing artefacts including the Artemision Bronze, a statue either of Zeus or Poseidon, and the Jockey of Artemision, a bronze statue of a racehorse and its rider.

In September 1952, the American School of Classical Studies at Athens made a return visit to the shipwreck, directed by George E. Mylonas, S. A. Dontas and Christos Karouzos. The excavation employed five divers and a sailing boat, the Alkyone, which was used to dredge the sea floor between dives. The project succeeded in re-locating the shipwreck, but did not recover any notable finds.

== See also ==
- Temple of Artemis
- Artemisio

== Bibliography ==
- Meritt, Lucy Shoe (1984). History of the American School of Classical Studies at Athens, 1939–1980 (PDF). Princeton: American School of Classical Studies at Athens. ISBN 9780876619421.
- Vogeikoff-Brogan, Natalia (2021-10-10). "The Artemision Shipwreck: Sinking into the ASCSA Archives". From the Archivist's Notebook.
- Woodford, Susan (1982). The Art of Greece and Rome. Cambridge: Cambridge University Press. ISBN 0521298733.
