= Onatas =

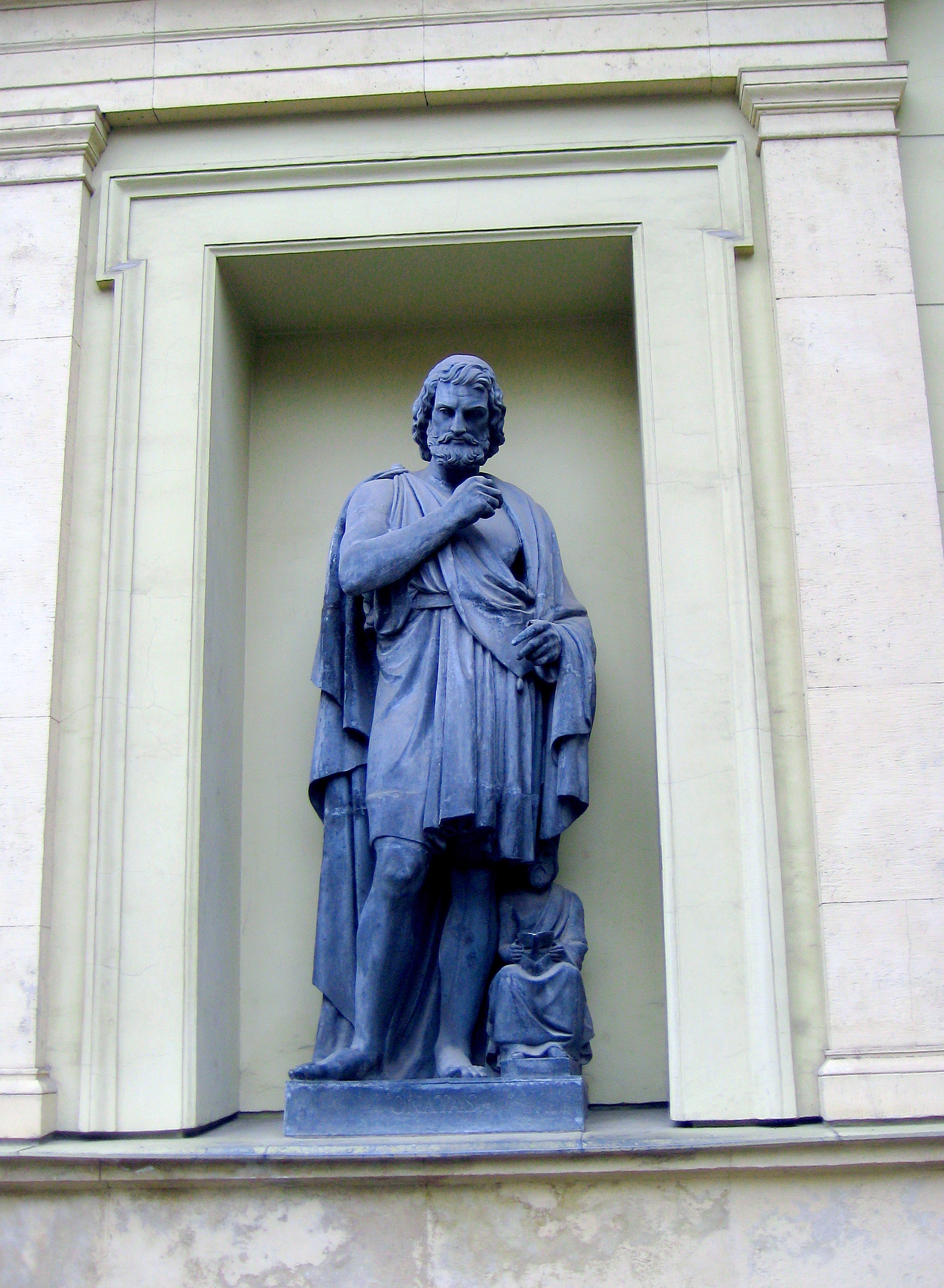
Statue of Onatas on the facade of the New Hermitage Building in St Petersburg, Russia

Onatas (Ancient Greek: Ὀνάτας) was an ancient Greek sculptor of the time of the Persian Wars and an exponent of the flourishing school of Aegina. Many of his works are mentioned by Pausanias; they included a Hermes carrying the ram, and a strange image of the Black Demeter made for the people of Phigalia; also some elaborate groups in bronze set up at Olympia and Delphi.

For Hiero I, king of Syracuse, Onatas executed a votive chariot in bronze dedicated at Olympia. In Delphi he was one of the sculptors who executed the Ex voto of the Tarentines.

If we compare the descriptions of the works of Onatas given us by Pausanias with the well-known pediments of Aegina at Munich we shall find so close an agreement that we may safely take the pedimental figures as an index of the style of Onatas. They are manly, vigorous, athletic, showing great knowledge of the human form, but somewhat stiff and automaton-like. His artistic style contribute to the formation of the so-called Severe style.

Onatas has also been linked to the Riace warriors group, also attributed to Phidias. The pair were found off the coast of Reggio Calabria in 1972.
