= Mummia gens =

Ancient Roman family

The gens Mummia was a plebeian family at Rome. Members of this gens are first mentioned after the Second Punic War, and within a generation, Lucius Mummius Achaicus became the first of the family to obtain the consulship. Although they were never numerous, Mummii continued to fill the highest offices of the state through the third century AD.

== Praenomina ==
The praenomina associated with the Mummii include Lucius, Quintus, Spurius, and Marcus.

== Branches and cognomina ==
As the Mummii were neither a large nor an old family, few of them are found with any surname in the time of the Republic. The chief exception was Achaicus, an agnomen won by Lucius Mummius, the consul of 146 BC, for his conquest of Greece, and he is said to have been the first novus homo to have earned such a distinction through his military achievements. Members of this gens are frequently found with cognomina in imperial times.

== Members ==
This list includes abbreviated praenomina. For an explanation of this practice, see filiation.

- Lucius Mummius, the father of the tribunes Lucius and Quintus.
- Lucius Mummius L. f., tribune of the plebs in 187 BC, opposed the attempt of Marcus Porcius Cato to place under scrutiny the payments made by Antiochus to Scipio Africanus and Scipio Asiaticus, but withdrew his opposition under intimidation. He was praetor in 177, obtaining the province of Sardinia.
- Quintus Mummius L. f., tribune of the plebs, and a colleague of his brother Lucius in 187 BC.
- Lucius Mummius L. f. L. n. Achaicus, consul in 146 BC, was a novus homo, but earned his surname by defeating the Achaean League, and bringing all of Greece under Roman control. Despite his burning of Corinth, Mummius gradually won the trust of the Greeks by establishing good government and embracing Hellenic culture.
- Spurius Mummius L. f. L. n., the brother of Achaicus, to whom he was philosophically opposed. Spurius served as his brother's legate at Corinth in 146 and 145 BC. He opposed the establishment of rhetorical academies at Rome, and wrote letters on ethics and satire.
- Spurius Mummius S. n., was a friend of Cicero, to whom he would read his grandfather's letters. In 46 BC, Cicero wrote that Mummius had died not long before.
- Mummius, a legate of Marcus Licinius Crassus in 72 BC, during the Servile War. He was defeated by Spartacus.
- Marcus Mummius, while praetor in 70 BC, presided over the trial of Verres.
- Mummius, (Note: Macrobius and Gellius refer to him as Memmius.) a comic playwright, active after 90 BC, mentioned by Charisius, Priscian, Macrobius, and Aulus Gellius.
- Mummia Achaica, great-granddaughter of Lucius Mummius Achaicus, and mother of the emperor Galba.
- Mummius Lupercus, sent by the consul Marcus Hordeonius Flaccus with two legions to fight Gaius Julius Civilis, leader of the Batavi, in AD 69. After being defeated, Mummius found his forces besieged; faced with starvation, his men eventually surrendered, and Mummius was slain by his captors.
- Lucius Mummius Niger Quintus Valerius Vegetus, consul suffectus in AD 112.
- Publius Mummius Sisenna, consul in AD 133.
- Publius Mummius Sisenna Rutilianus, consul suffectus in AD 146.
- Lucius Mummius Felix Cornelianus, consul in AD 237.
- Mummius Bassus, consul in AD 258.

== See also ==
- List of Roman gentes

== Bibliography ==
- Polybius, Historiae (The Histories).
- Marcus Tullius Cicero, Brutus, De Lege Agraria contra Rullum, De Officiis, De Oratore, De Republica, Epistulae ad Atticum, In Verrem, Laelius de Amicitia, Orator ad M. Brutum, Paradoxa Stoicorum, Pro Gaio Cornelio, Pro Murena.
- Diodorus Siculus, Bibliotheca Historica (Library of History).
- Titus Livius (Livy), Ab Urbe Condita (History of Rome).
- Strabo, Geographica.
- Marcus Velleius Paterculus, Compendium of Roman History.
- Valerius Maximus, Factorum ac Dictorum Memorabilium (Memorable Facts and Sayings).
- Gaius Plinius Secundus (Pliny the Elder), Naturalis Historia (Natural History).
- Publius Cornelius Tacitus, Annales, Historiae.
- Plutarchus, Lives of the Noble Greeks and Romans.
- Gaius Suetonius Tranquillus, De Vita Caesarum (Lives of the Caesars, or The Twelve Caesars).
- Lucius Annaeus Florus, Epitome de T. Livio Bellorum Omnium Annorum DCC (Epitome of Livy: All the Wars of Seven Hundred Years).
- Appianus Alexandrinus (Appian), Hispanica (The Spanish Wars), Punica (The Punic Wars).
- Aulus Gellius, Noctes Atticae (Attic Nights).
- Pausanias, Description of Greece.
- Lucius Cassius Dio Cocceianus (Cassius Dio), Roman History.
- Eutropius, Breviarium Historiae Romanae (Abridgement of the History of Rome).
- Paulus Orosius, Historiarum Adversum Paganos (History Against the Pagans).
- Ambrosius Theodosius Macrobius, Saturnalia.
- Priscianus Caesariensis (Priscian), Institutiones Grammaticae (Institutes of Grammar).
- Joannes Zonaras, Epitome Historiarum (Epitome of History).
- Dictionary of Greek and Roman Biography and Mythology, William Smith, ed., Little, Brown and Company, Boston (1849).
- Paul von Rohden, Elimar Klebs, & Hermann Dessau, Prosopographia Imperii Romani (The Prosopography of the Roman Empire, abbreviated PIR), Berlin (1898).
- T. Robert S. Broughton, The Magistrates of the Roman Republic, American Philological Association (1952).
