= Meliboea (Magnesia) =

Map showing ancient Thessaly. Meliboea is shown to the centre right in Magnesia.

Meliboea or Meliboia (Ancient Greek: Μελίβοια) was a town and polis (city-state) of Magnesia in ancient Thessaly, mentioned by Homer, in the Catalogue of Ships in the Iliad, as one of the places subject to Philoctetes. It was situated upon the sea coast, and is described by Livy as situated at the roots of Mount Ossa, and by Strabo as lying in the gulf between Mount Ossa and Mount Pelion.

The town was famous for its purple dye. Even down to the 19th century, the shellfish from which the purple dye is obtained were found off the coast of Thessaly.

Herodotus mentions it as the place where several Persian ships under command of Xerxes I crashed during a storm, prior to the Battle of Thermopylae (480 BCE), while other Persian ships crashed adjacent to Sepias and others in front of Casthanaea.

During the Roman-Seleucid War, it was one of the Thessalian cities that in the year 191 BCE, being held by Athamanians, was taken by a joint army of the Roman Marcus Baebius Tamphilus and Philip V of Macedon. It was conquered by the Romans in 168 BCE and plundered.

Meliboea was taken and plundered by the Romans under Gnaeus Octavius in 168 BCE. Meliboea is also mentioned by Strabo, Stephanus of Byzantium, Pomponius Mela, and Pliny the Elder.

Its exact location is unknown, but it is usually located near the modern Agia, at the place called Kastro Velika, located in the community of Velika, municipal unit of Melivoia, which echoes the ancient name.
