= Ancient Magnesia =

Region of Ancient Greece

Map showing ancient Thessaly; Magnesia is shown to the right

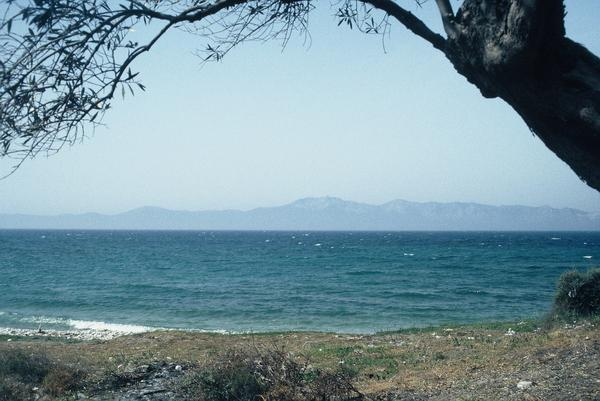
Beach at Cape Artemisium; Magnesia in the distance

Anciently, Magnesia (Ancient Greek: Μαγνησία) was a region of Ancient Greece, eventually absorbed by ancient Thessaly. Originally inhabited by the ancient Magnetes (Μάγνητες), Magnesia was the long and narrow slip of country between Mounts Ossa and Pelion on the west and the sea on the east, and extending from the mouth of the Peneius on the north to the Pagasaean Gulf on the south. The Magnetes were members of the Amphictyonic League, and were settled in this district in the Homeric times, and mentioned in the Iliad.

== Towns ==
The towns of Ancient Magnesia were:

- Aesonis
- Aphetae
- Boebe
- Casthanaea
- Cercinium
- Coracae
- Demetrias
- Eurymenae
- Glaphyrae
- Homole or Homolium
- Iolcus
- Magnesia
- Meliboea
- Methone
- Mylae
- Nelia
- Olizon
- Pagasae
- Rhizus
- Spalaethra
- Thaumacia

The Thessalian Magnetes are said to have founded the Asiatic cities of Magnesia ad Sipylum and Magnesia on the Maeander.
