= Walter Raymond Agard =

American classicist

- Born: Walter Raymond Agard; January 16, 1894; Rockville, Connecticut, US
- Died: July 12, 1978 (aged 84); Madison, Wisconsin, US
- Education: Amherst University
- Occupations: Classicist (Latin); author; academic
- Spouse: Elizabeth Marshall Maltby (m. 1923)
- Scientific career
- Fields: Classics
- Workplaces: University of Wisconsin

Walter Raymond Agard (January 16, 1894 – July 12, 1978) was an American classical scholar who specialized in ancient Greek sculpture.

== Life ==
Agard was born on January 16, 1894, in Rockville, Connecticut to Isaac Merritt and Ida Gerana Chaffee.

He married Elizabeth Marshall Maltby on 14 August 1923.

He died on July 12, 1978, in Madison, Wisconsin.

== Education ==
Agard completed his B.A. degree in classics at Amherst University in 1915.

== Career ==
He served as a professor of classics at the University of Wisconsin.

== Bibliography ==
Agard is the author of a number of notable books:

- Classical gods and heroes
- The Greek tradition in sculpture
- The new architectural sculpture

== See also ==
- Ancient Greek sculpture
