= List of settlements in the Magnesia regional unit =

This is a list of settlements in the Magnesia regional unit, Greece.

- Achilleio
- Aerino
- Afetes
- Agia Triada
- Agioi Theodoroi
- Agios Dimitrios Piliou
- Agios Georgios Feron
- Agios Georgios Nileias
- Agios Ioannis, in Almyros municipality
- Agios Ioannis, Pelion
- Agios Lavrentios
- Agios Onoufrios
- Agios Vlasios
- Agria
- Aidini
- Alli Meria
- Almyros
- Amaliapoli
- Anakasia
- Anavra
- Anilio
- Ano Lechonia
- Ano Volos
- Anthotopos
- Argalasti
- Dimini
- Drakeia
- Drymonas
- Efxeinoupoli
- Glafyra
- Kala Nera
- Kalamaki
- Kanalia
- Kato Lechonia
- Katochori
- Keramidi
- Kerasia
- Kissos
- Kofoi
- Kokkotoi
- Kroki
- Lafkos
- Lampinou
- Makrinitsa
- Makryrrachi
- Metochi
- Mikro Perivolaki
- Mikrothives
- Milies
- Milina
- Mouresi
- Nea Anchialos
- Nea Ionia
- Neochori
- Perivlepto
- Fylaki
- Pinakates
- Platanos
- Portaria
- Pouri
- Promyri
- Pteleos
- Rizomylos
- Sesklo
- Sourpi
- Stagiates
- Stefanovikeio
- Syki
- Trikeri
- Tsagkarada
- Velestino
- Volos
- Vrynaina
- Vyzitsa
- Xinovrysi
- Xorychti
- Zagora

== See also ==
- List of towns and villages of Greece
