= Xorychti =

Xorychti Ξορύχτι
- Community
- Location within Greece
- Coordinates: 39°22′N 23°11′E
- Country: Greece
- Administrative region: Thessaly
- Regional unit: Magnesia
- Municipality: Zagora-Mouresi
- Municipal unit: Mouresi

Population (2021)
  - Community: 155
- Time zone: UTC+2 (EET)
  - Summer (DST): UTC+3 (EEST)
- Vehicle registration: ΒΟ

Xorychti (Greek: Ξορύχτι) a village and a community in the municipal unit of Mouresi in the eastern part of Magnesia, Greece. It is situated at 420 m elevation, on the eastern slope of the forested Pelion mountains. The community includes the village Kato Xorychti. Xorychti is located 2 km northwest of Lampinou, 3 km south of Tsagkarada, 5 km northeast of Milies, 12 km southeast of Zagora and 21 km east of the city of Volos (Magnesia's capital).

== Population ==
Year	Village population	Community population
1981	256	-
1991	226	-
2001	278	299
2011	219	248
2021	115	155

== See also ==
- List of settlements in the Magnesia regional unit
