= Damouchari =

Greek village

Damouchari Νταμούχαρη
- Community
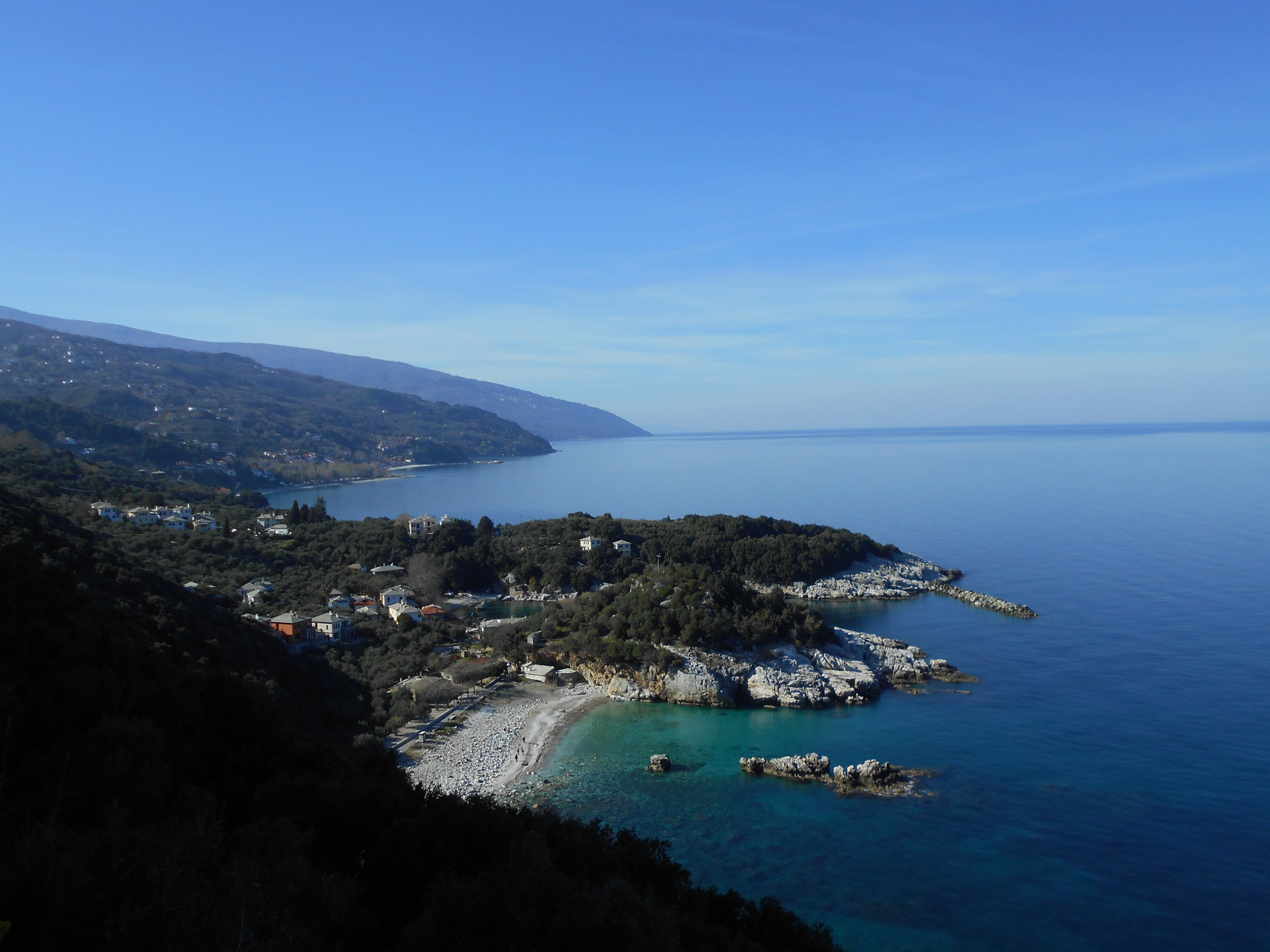
- Damouchari

- Location within Greece
- Coordinates: 39°24′16.5″N 23°10′48.2″E
- Country: Greece
- Administrative region: Thessaly
- Regional unit: Magnesia
- Municipality: Zagora-Mouresi
- Municipal unit: Mouresi

Population (2021)
  - Community: 33
- Time zone: UTC+2 (EET)
  - Summer (DST): UTC+3 (EEST)

Damouchari (Greek: Νταμούχαρη), also written Damouhari, is a seaside village in Pelion in the region of Thessaly, Greece.

== Village information ==
Damouchari is located on the coast of the Aegean Sea at an altitude of 46 meters and is approximately 46 km from Volos, 25 km from Zagora (the seat of the municipality) and 4 km from Mouresi, whose port it is. It is an old fishing village that has developed into a summer tourist destination in northeastern Pelion. It has two bays - its natural harbor and the pebble beach "Palia Damouchari". In September 2007, scenes from the film Mamma Mia! were shot here.

The village also has the ruins of an old castle, built by the Byzantines and later used by the Venetians, which dates to at least the 11th century. Nearby, the Church of Agios Nikolaos was built in 1744 according to its inscription.

The 2021 census recorded 33 inhabitants.
