= Anilio, Magnesia =

Anilio Ανήλιο
- Community
- Location within Greece
- Coordinates: 39°25′N 23°8′E
- Country: Greece
- Administrative region: Thessaly
- Regional unit: Magnesia
- Municipality: Zagora-Mouresi
- Municipal unit: Mouresi

Population (2021)
  - Community: 297
- Time zone: UTC+2 (EET)
  - Summer (DST): UTC+3 (EEST)
- Vehicle registration: ΒΟ

Anilio (Greek: Ανήλιο, literally "without sun") is a village and a community in the municipal unit of Mouresi in the eastern part of Magnesia, Greece. It is situated at 296 meters elevation on the forested eastern slope of the Pelion mountains, 2 km from the Aegean Sea coast. The community includes the village Plaka. Anilio is 1.5 km northwest of Agios Dimitrios, 1.5 km southeast of Makryrrachi, 4 km southeast of Zagora and about 18 km east of the city of Volos (Magnesia's capital).

== Population ==
Year	Village population	Community population
1981	480	-
1991	356	-
2001	408	437
2011	355	382
2021	284	297

== See also ==
- List of settlements in the Magnesia regional unit
