= Tsagkarada =

Tsagkarada Τσαγκαράδα
- Community
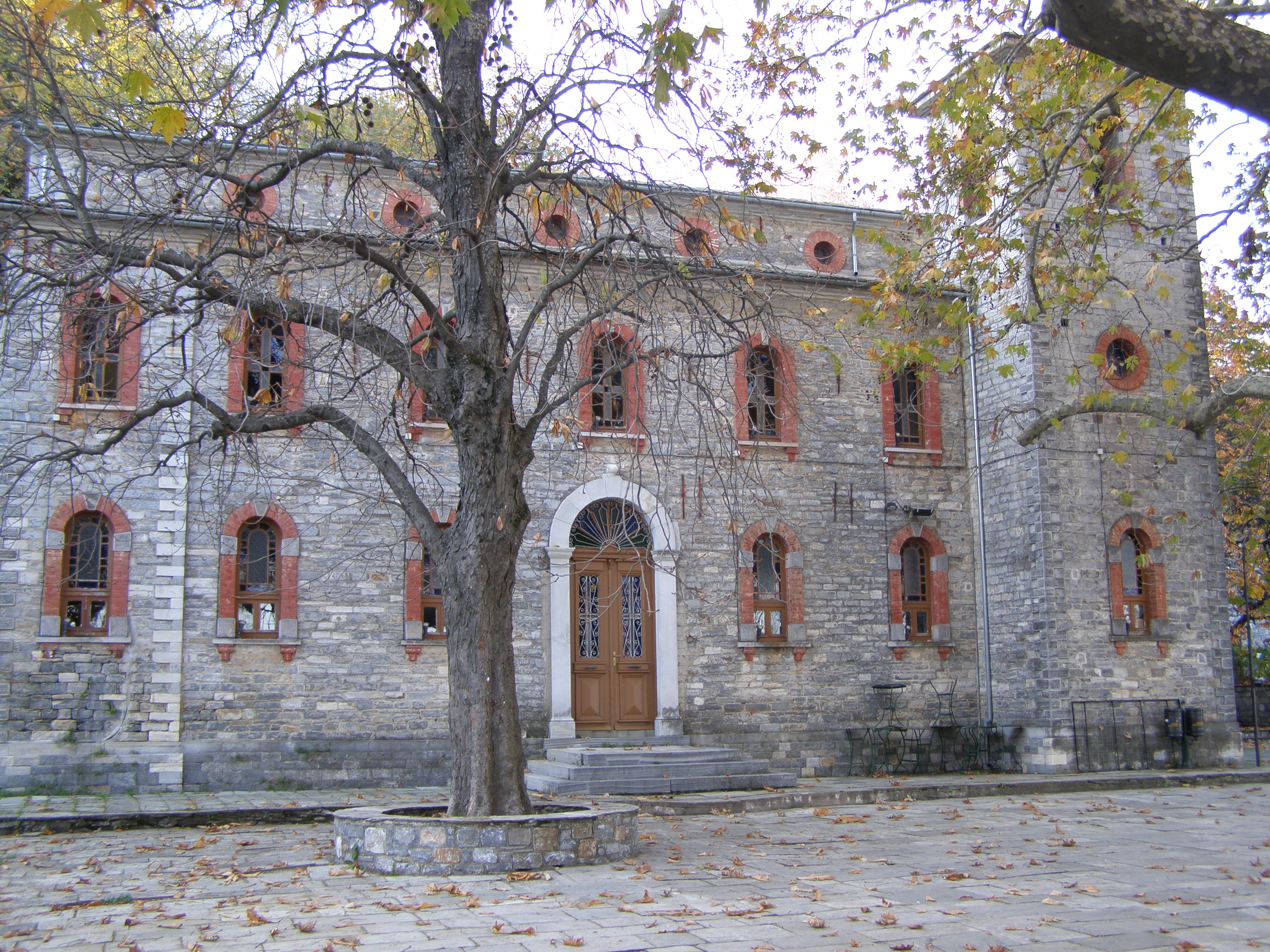
- The church of Agia Paraskevi.

- Location within Greece
- Coordinates: 39°23′N 23°11′E
- Country: Greece
- Administrative region: Thessaly
- Regional unit: Magnesia
- Municipality: Zagora-Mouresi
- Municipal unit: Mouresi

Population (2021)
  - Community: 428
- Time zone: UTC+2 (EET)
  - Summer (DST): UTC+3 (EEST)
- Vehicle registration: ΒΟ

Tsagkarada (Greek: Τσαγκαράδα) is a village and a community in the municipal unit of Mouresi in the eastern part of Magnesia, Greece.

It was the seat of the former municipality Mouresi. It is situated at 408 m elevation, on the eastern slope of the forested Pelion mountains. The community includes the village Mylopotamos. Tsagkarada is located 1.5 km southeast of Mouresi, 3 km north of Xorychti, 9 km southeast of Zagora and about 20 km east of the city of Volos (Magnesia's capital).

In the main square, near Agia Paraskevi church, there is a big platanus tree. Perhaps the oldest of Greece, it is said to be at least one thousand years old. It has a perimeter of nearly 20 meters.

== Population ==
Historical population
Year	Pop.	±%
1981	646	—
1991	722	+11.8%
2001	603	−16.5%
2011	543	−10.0%
2021	428	−21.2%

== See also ==
- List of settlements in the Magnesia regional unit
