= Agios Dimitrios Piliou =

Agios Dimitrios Piliou Άγιος Δημήτριος Πηλίου
- Community
- Location within Greece
- Coordinates: 39°25′N 23°9′E
- Country: Greece
- Administrative region: Thessaly
- Regional unit: Magnesia
- Municipality: Zagora-Mouresi
- Municipal unit: Mouresi

Population (2021)
  - Community: 251
- Time zone: UTC+2 (EET)
  - Summer (DST): UTC+3 (EEST)
- Vehicle registration: ΒΟ

Agios Dimitrios Piliou (Greek: Άγιος Δημήτριος Πηλίου) is a village and a community in the municipality of Zagora-Mouresi, in the eastern part of Magnesia, Greece. The community includes the village of Agios Ioannis.

Agios Dimitrios is located on the eastern slope of the densely forested Pelion mountains, at about 170 meters elevation. It is 1 km southwest of the village Agios Ioannis, which is on the Aegean Sea coast. It is 1.5 km southeast of Anilio, 2 km northwest of Mouresi, 5 km southeast of Zagora and 19 km east of the city of Volos (Magnesia's capital).

== Population ==
Year	Village population	Community population
1981	348	-
1991	442	-
2001	268	508
2011	243	422
2021	181	251
