= Agios Vlasios, Magnesia =

Agios Vlasios Άγιος Βλάσιος
- Community
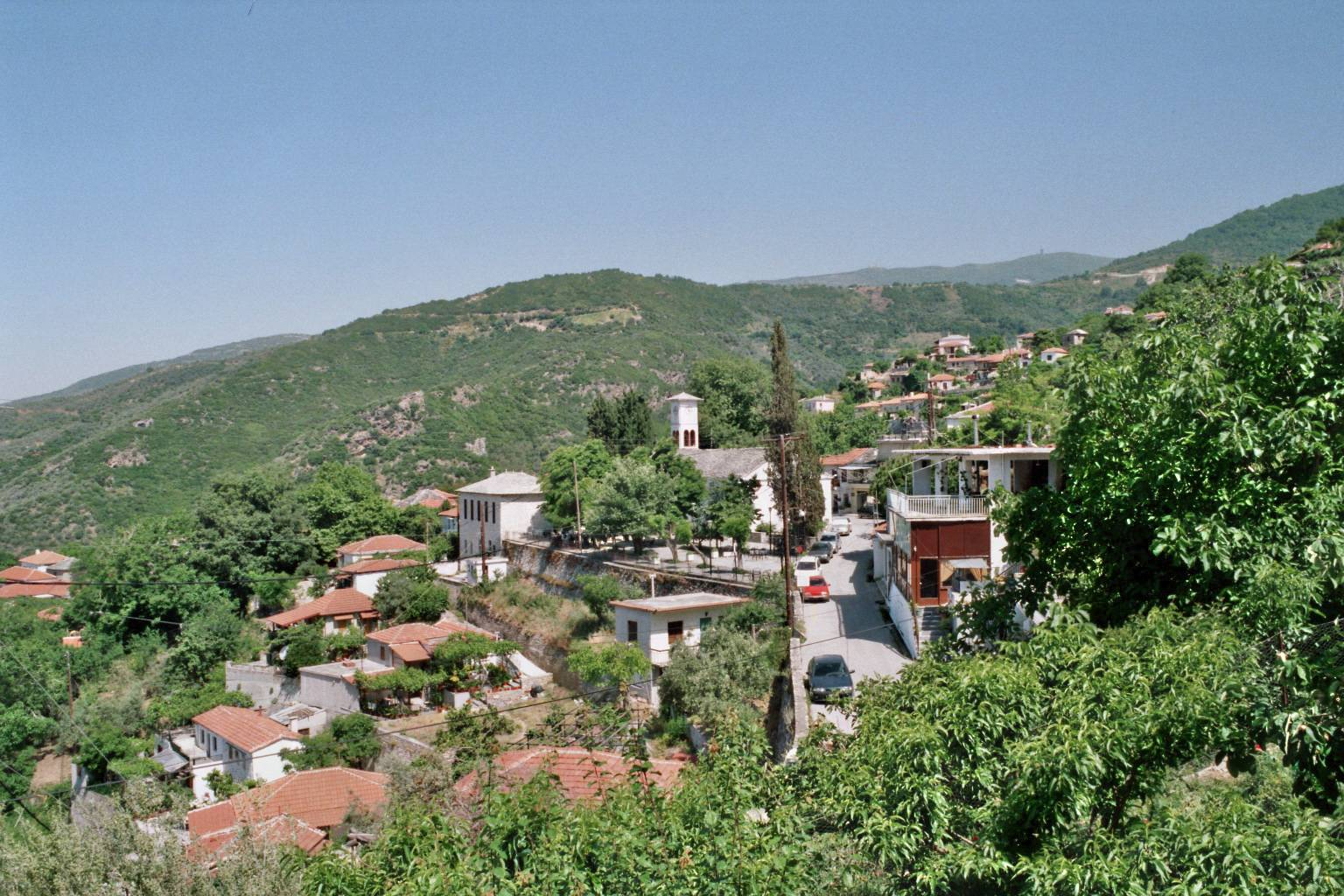

- Location within Greece
- Coordinates: 39°20′N 23°3′E
- Country: Greece
- Administrative region: Thessaly
- Regional unit: Magnesia
- Municipality: Volos
- Municipal unit: Artemida
- Elevation: 262 m (860 ft)

Population (2021)
  - Community: 457
- Time zone: UTC+2 (EET)
  - Summer (DST): UTC+3 (EEST)
- Postal code: 385 00
- Area code: 24280
- Vehicle registration: BO

Agios Vlasios (Greek: Άγιος Βλάσιος meaning Saint Blaise, before 1927: Καραμπάσι - Karampasi, Turkish: Karabaş "black head") is a village and a community in the municipal unit of Artemida, Magnesia, Greece. Agios Vlasios is situated on the slopes of mount Pelion, 1.5 km west of Agios Georgios Nileias, 2 km northeast of Ano Lechonia and 11 km east of Volos. The name comes from the church of the village.

== Subdivisions ==
The community Agios Vlasios consists of the following villages:

- Agios Vlasios [2021 pop: 280]
- Malaki [pop: 109]
- Palaiokastro [pop: 43]
- Strofilos [pop: 25]

== Population ==
| Year | Village population | Community population |
|---|---|---|
| 1971 | 568 | - |
| 1981 | - | 772 |
| 1991 | 548 | - |
| 2001 | 485 | 785 |
| 2011 | 322 | 515 |
| 2021 | 280 | 457 |

== History ==
During the Turkish Era, the village Palaiokastro which is located between Ano Lechonia and Agios Vlasios was inhabited by Turks. After Thessaly joined Greece in 1881 Agios Vlasios (then Karampasi) became a part of the municipality of Nileia. In 1912, it became an independent community. In 1997, Agios Vlasios became a part of the municipality of Artemida which has its seat at nearby Ano Lechonia. In 2010 Artemida became part of the municipality of Volos.

== See also ==
- List of settlements in the Magnesia regional unit
