= Agios Ioannis, Pelion =

Agios Ioannis Άγιος Ιωάννης Πηλίου
- Settlement
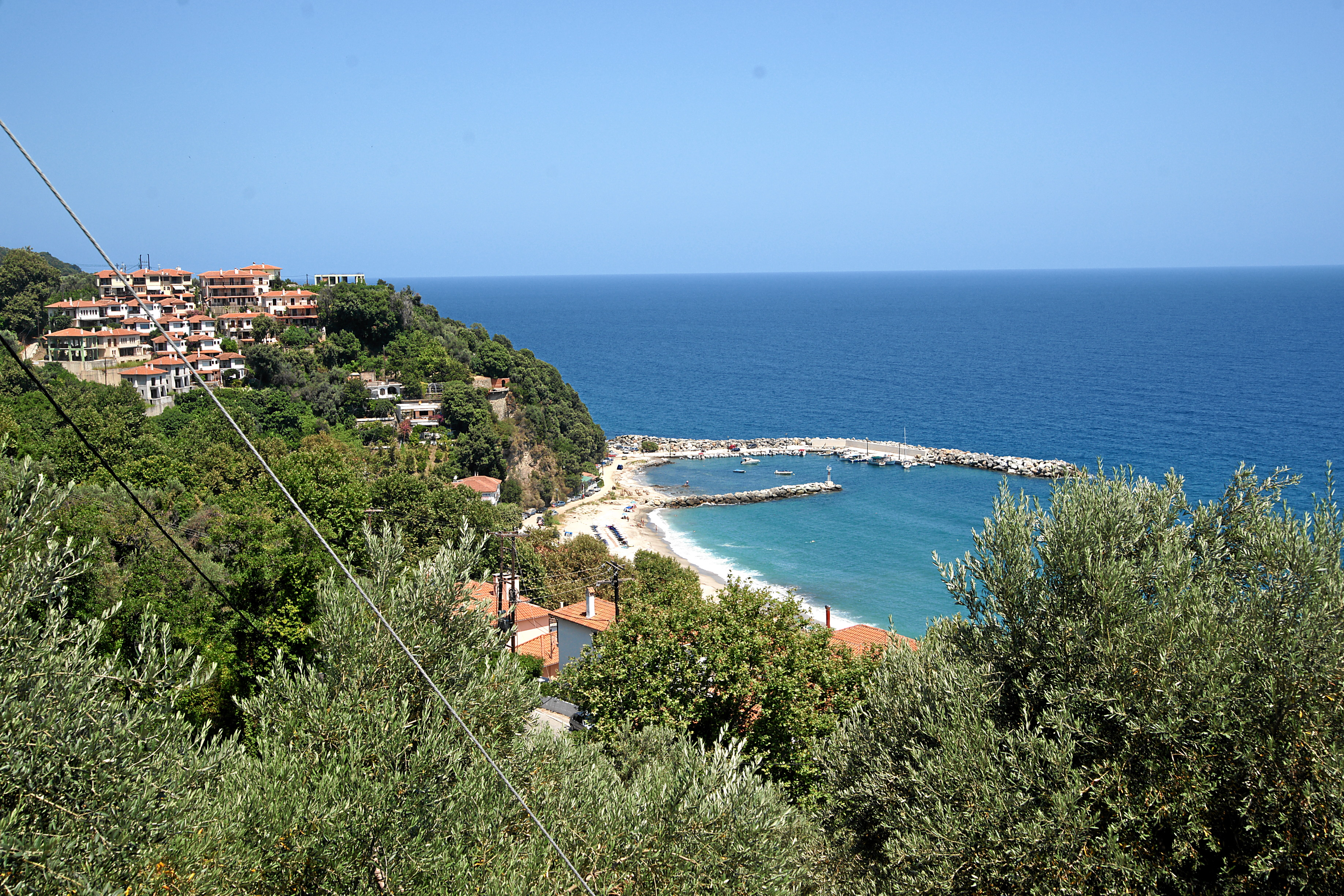

- Location within Greece
- Coordinates: 39°25′0″N 23°9′45″E
- Country: Greece
- Administrative region: Thessaly
- Regional unit: Magnesia
- Municipality: Zagora-Mouresi
- Municipal unit: Mouresi
- Community: Agios Dimitrios Piliou

Population (2021)
  - Total: 70
- Time zone: UTC+2 (EET)
  - Summer (DST): UTC+3 (EEST)
- Vehicle registration: ΒΟ

Agios Ioannis (Greek: Άγιος Ιωάννης Πηλίου) is a village and a beach resort on the east coast of Pelion in Magnesia, Greece. It forms part of the community of Agios Dimitrios Piliou in the municipality of Zagora-Mouresi.

Agios Ioannis is one of the most popular beaches in Pelion. It has a small port used by fishing boats and yachts.
