= Pinakates =

Pinakates Πινακάτες
- Community
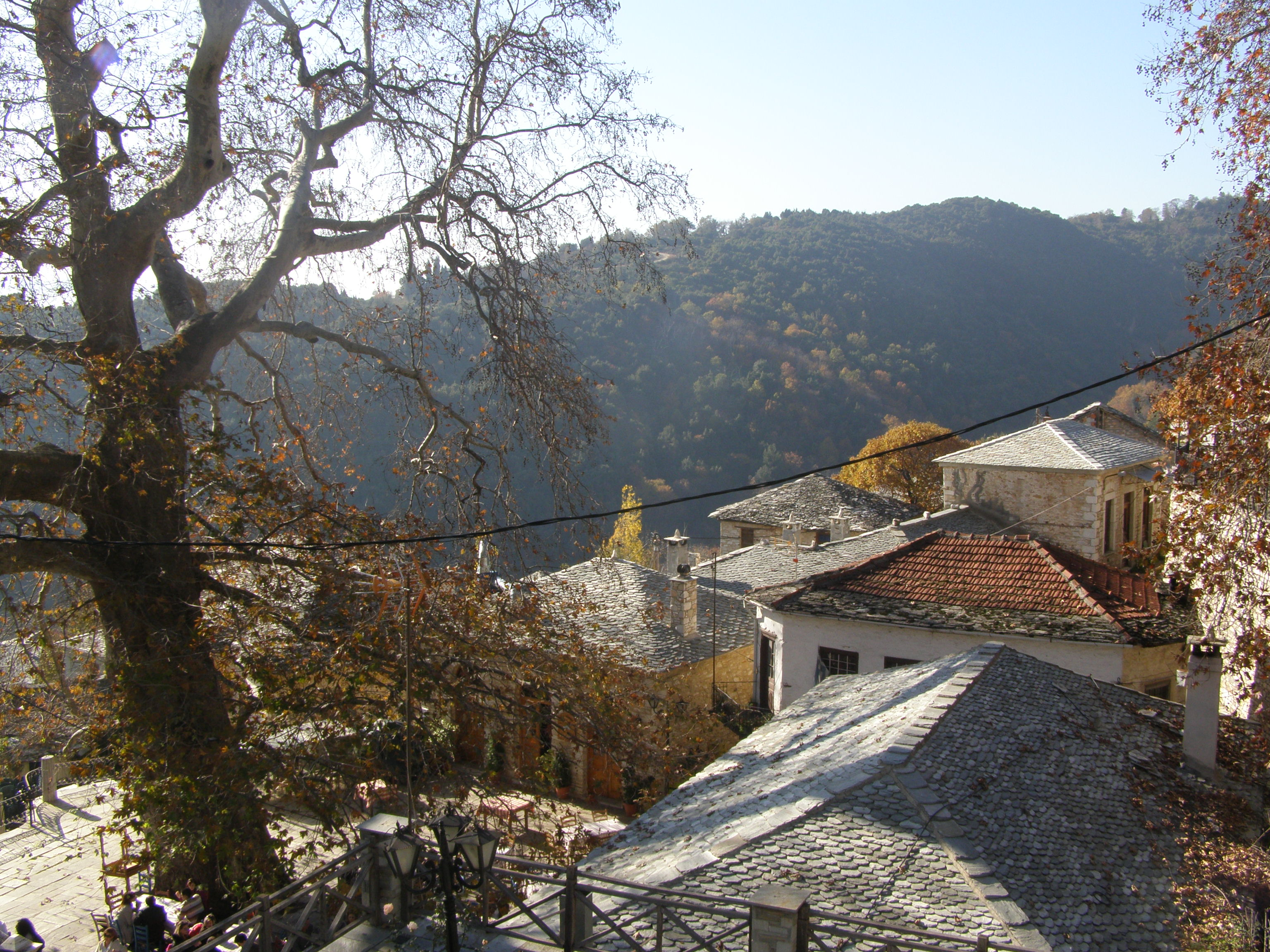

- Location within Greece
- Coordinates: 39°20′N 23°7′E
- Country: Greece
- Administrative region: Thessaly
- Regional unit: Magnesia
- Municipality: South Pelion
- Municipal unit: Milies

Population (2021)
  - Community: 326
- Time zone: UTC+2 (EET)
  - Summer (DST): UTC+3 (EEST)
- Vehicle registration: ΒΟ

Pinakates (Greek: Πινακάτες) is a mountain village in the Magnesia regional unit, Greece. It is part of the municipal unit of Milies.

== Geography ==
Pinakates is on the southwestern slopes of the Pelion mountain range. It is 3 km west of Milies, 3 km east of Agios Georgios Nileias, 3 km north of Kala Nera (on the Pagasetic Gulf coast) and 15 km east of Volos.

== Population ==
Year	Population village	Population community
1971	30	324
1991	-	326
1991	138	-
2001	182	312
2011	211	322
2021	195	326

== History ==
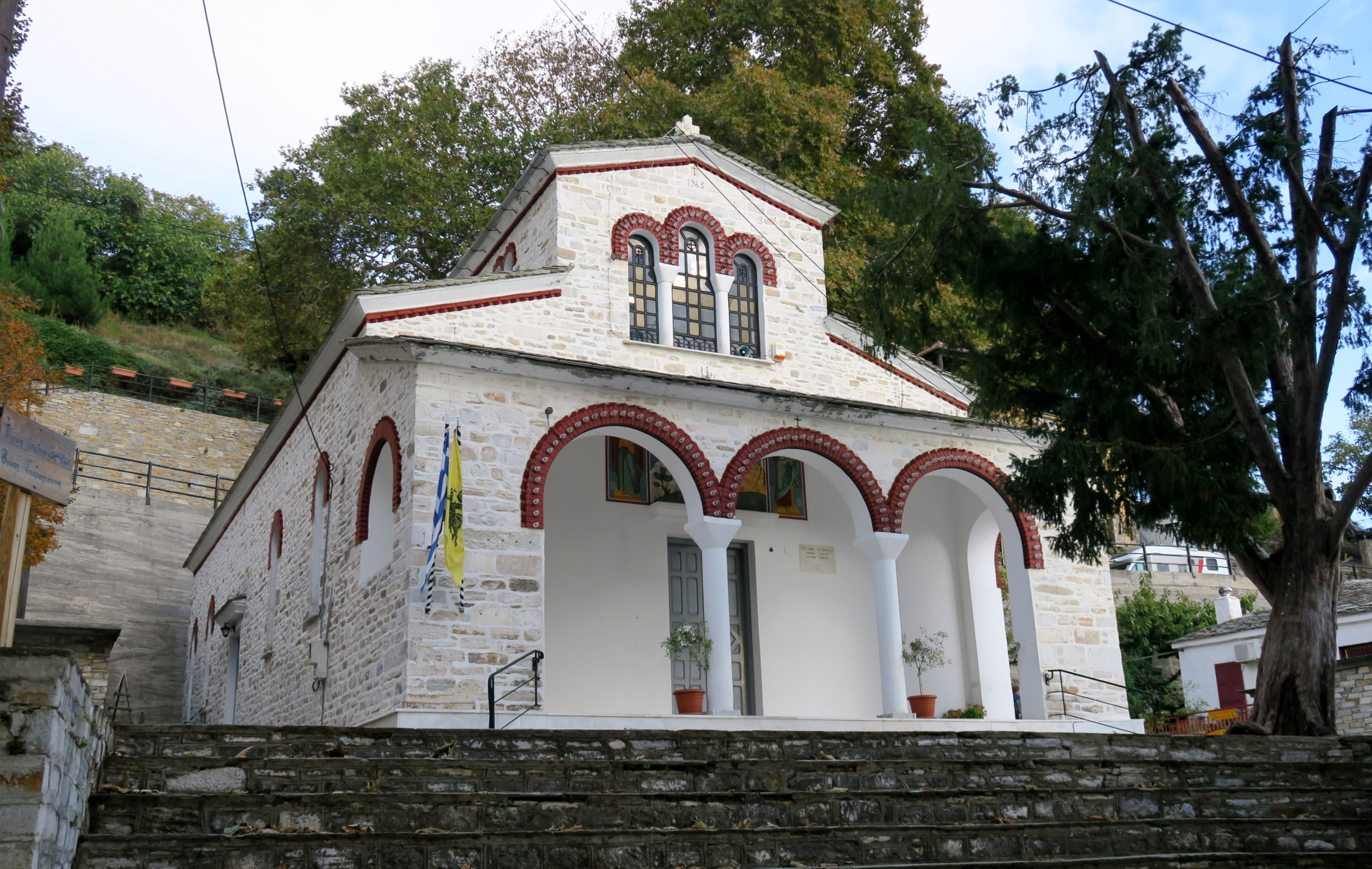
Church of Agios Dimitrios.

The village of Pinakates is first mentioned in the Modern Geography of Greece (Γεωγραφία Νεωτερική περί της Ελλάδο = Geografia Neoteriki peri tis Ellados) by Daniil Filippidis and Grigoriou Konstantas (Vienna 1791). At that time, the village comprised about 100 houses, but surely it was built much earlier.

In 1828, the village had 1,000 inhabitants. In 1860, the village counted 160 families and 800 residents. Pinakates joined the rest of Greece when Thessaly was liberated in 1881. In the early 20th century, a school with 56 students was opened. One of the main benefactors of this school was a business man from Pinakates, Ioannis G. Sarafopoulos. The main industry in Pinakates became the production of wine and oil. Also the culture of olives boosted the village's economy. Money from Greeks living in Egypt contributed to the development of the village.

Pinakates is considered to be one of the best preserved of the 24 villages in Pilion and therefore became a category 1-protected landmark. The village was so well preserved because until recently it was only accessible via one road which ends in the center of the village. All other roads could only be used on foot or by mule. The isolated position on the mountain side kept the village well preserved, but also almost caused its downfall. During the last decade of the previous century, only five families lived in Pinakates during wintertime. Currently it counts about 150 people, although on the voting registers 350 names are listed. However, a lot of them have moved to neighbouring villages. Due to the limited number of children in the village, it no longer has a school.

== See also ==
- List of settlements in the Magnesia regional unit
