= Pelion =

Mountain in Thessaly, Greece

- Πήλιο; Pilio
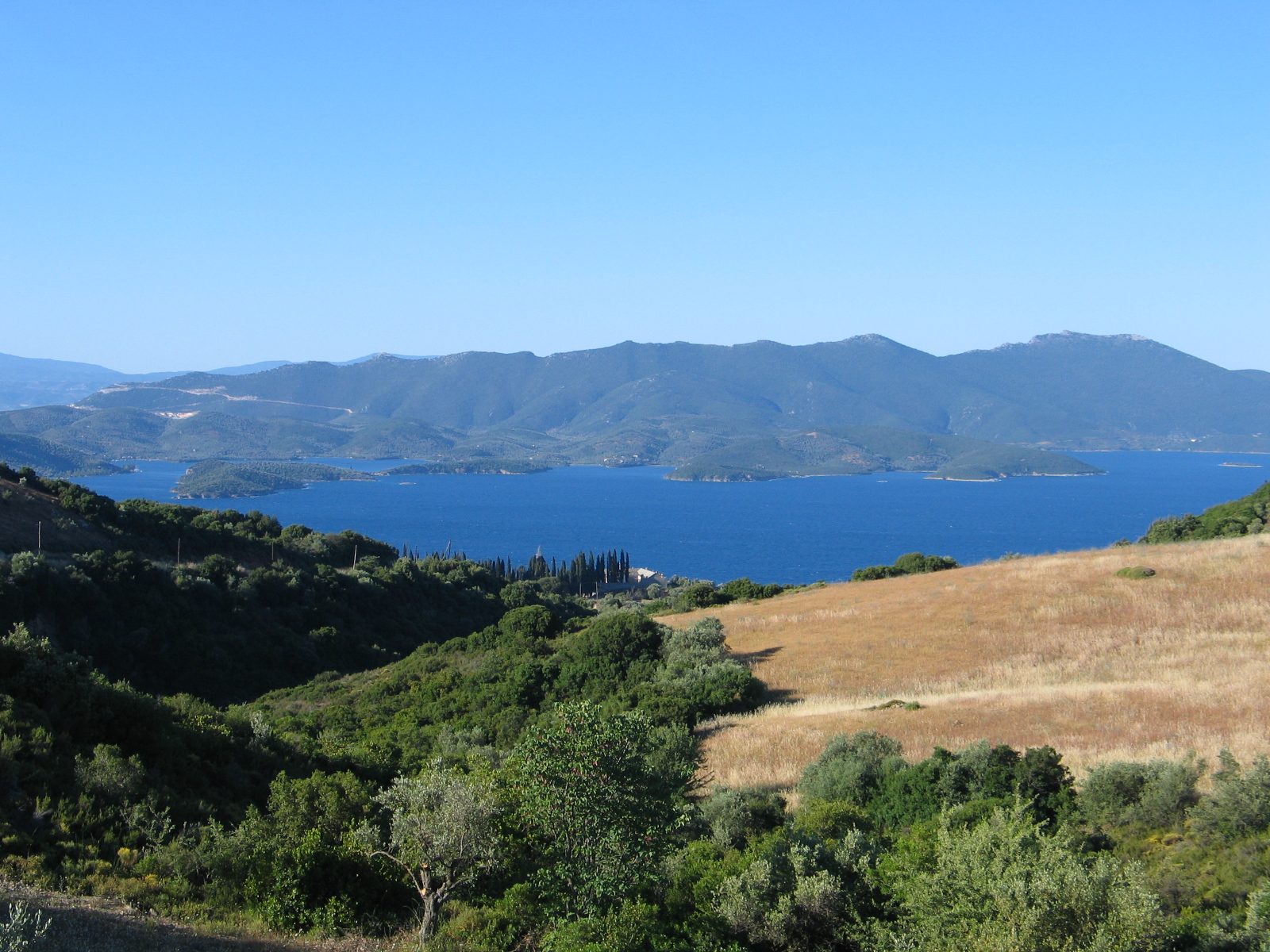
- Southern hook

Highest point
- Elevation: 1,624 m (5,328 ft)
- Prominence: 1,473 m (4,833 ft)
- Listing: Ribu
- Coordinates: 39°26′19″N 23°2′47″E

Naming
- Pronunciation: Greek: [ˈpiʎo]

Geography
- Location within Greece
- Location: Eastern Magnesia, Greece
- Parent range: Pilio

Geology
- Mountain type: Fold

Climbing
- Easiest route: Road, climbing

Pelion or Pelium (Modern Greek: Πήλιο, Pílio; Ancient Greek/Katharevousa: Πήλιον, Pēlion) is a mountain at the southeastern part of Thessaly in northern Greece, forming a hook-like peninsula between the Pagasetic Gulf and the Aegean Sea. Its highest summit, Pourianos Stavros, is 1,624 metres (5,328 ft) amsl. The EO34 national road runs through the southern portion of the peninsula, and the EO34a runs through the middle.

== Geography and economy ==
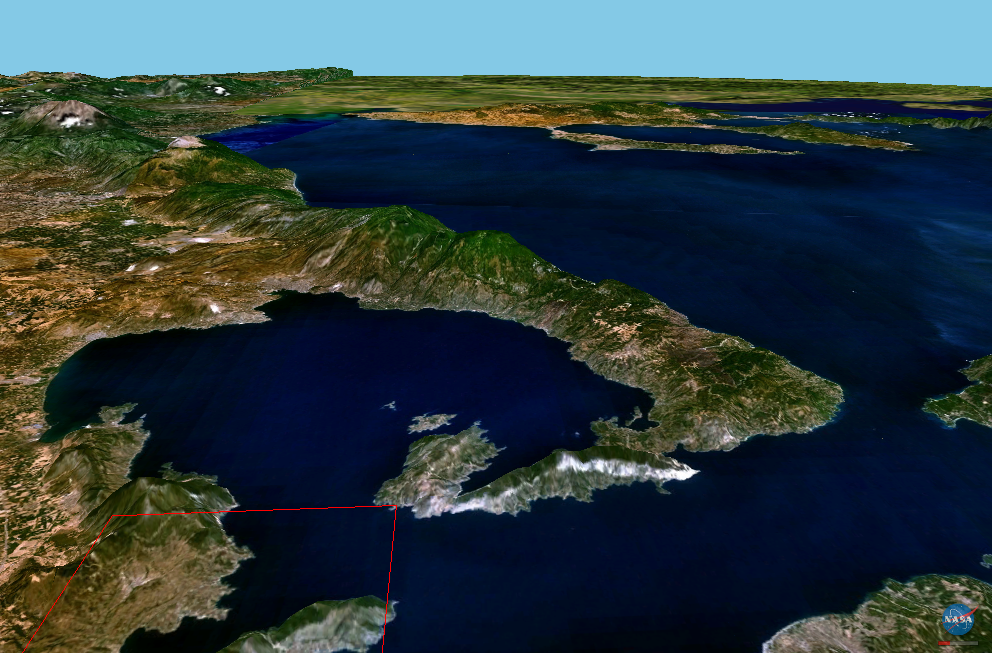
Satellite view of the hook-like peninsula formed by Mount Pelion

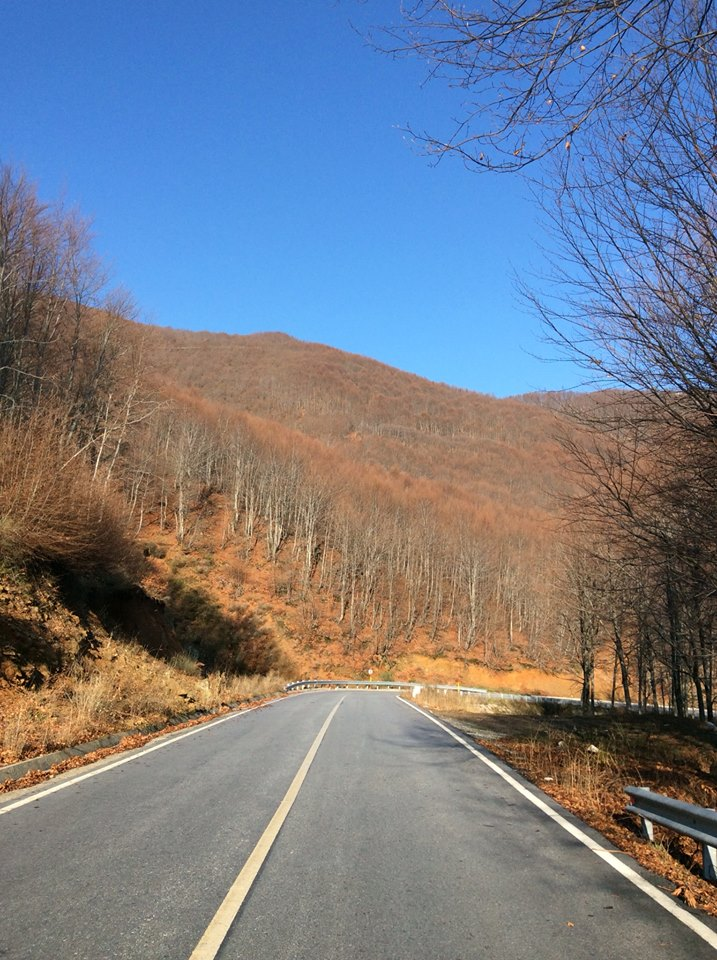
Forest in Mount Pelion

The mountain is thickly forested, with both deciduous and perennial forests, mainly of beech, oak, maple and chestnut trees, with olive, apple, pear trees and plane tree groves surrounding places with water. Pelion is considered one of the most beautiful mountains in Greece and is a popular tourist attraction throughout the year: hiking trails and stone paths give access to springs, coves and numerous beaches, sandy or pebbly, set among lusciously green slopes. Pelion is an amply watered mountain with an abundance of springs, gorges, streams and rivulets; many streams are routed in carved-stone artificial beds to bring water to the villages and their thriving orchards. The higher elevations of the mountain receive enough snowfall so as to host skiing facilities that operate from Christmas to Easter.

Pelian cuisine specializes in charcuterie, its most famed dish being spentzofáï, a hearty stew made of sliced pork sausage that is first cooked on its own, then stewed with green and red peppers, mild or hot as the case may be, and shallots or small onions; aubergine or tomatoes are added when seasonally available. Pelion is also renowned for its orchard fruit, with pride of place going to the firíki, an originally Egyptian apple varietal of very small, oval-shaped, intensely fragrant, crisp and slightly tart apples that withstand long storage without refrigeration. There is also wide cultivation of plums, especially mirabelles and greengages.

== Mythology ==
In Greek mythology, Mount Pelion (which took its name from the mythical king Peleus, father of Achilles) was the homeland of Chiron the Centaur, tutor of many ancient Greek heroes, such as Jason, Achilles, Theseus and Heracles. On Mount Pelion, near Chiron's cave, the marriage of Thetis and Peleus took place. The uninvited goddess Eris, to take revenge for having been kept outside the party, brought a golden apple with the inscription "To the Fairest". The dispute that then arose between the goddesses Hera, Aphrodite and Athena resulted in events leading to the Trojan War.

When the twins Otus and Ephialtes attempted to storm Olympus, they piled Mount Pelion upon Mount Ossa (whence the idiom, to "pile Pelion on Ossa").

== In literature ==
William Shakespeare references the mountain in Act II, scene i of The Merry Wives of Windsor: "He will print them, out of doubt; for he cares not what he puts into the press, when he would put us two: I had rather be a giantess, and lie under Mount Pelion." He also refers to it in Hamlet as "T' o'ertop old Pelion or the skyish head / Of blue Olympus." (5.1.229-230).

Herman Melville uses its mythological images in Book XXV of Pierre; or, The Ambiguities: "You saw Enceladus the Titan, the most potent of all the giants, writhing from out the imprisoning earth;—turbaned with upborn moss he writhed; still, though armless, resisting with his whole striving trunk, the Pelion and the Ossa hurled back at him;—turbaned with upborn moss he writhed; still turning his unconquerable front toward that majestic mount eternally in vain assailed by him, and which, when it had stormed him off, had heaved his undoffable incubus upon him, and deridingly left him there to bay out his ineffectual howl."

== Recent history ==
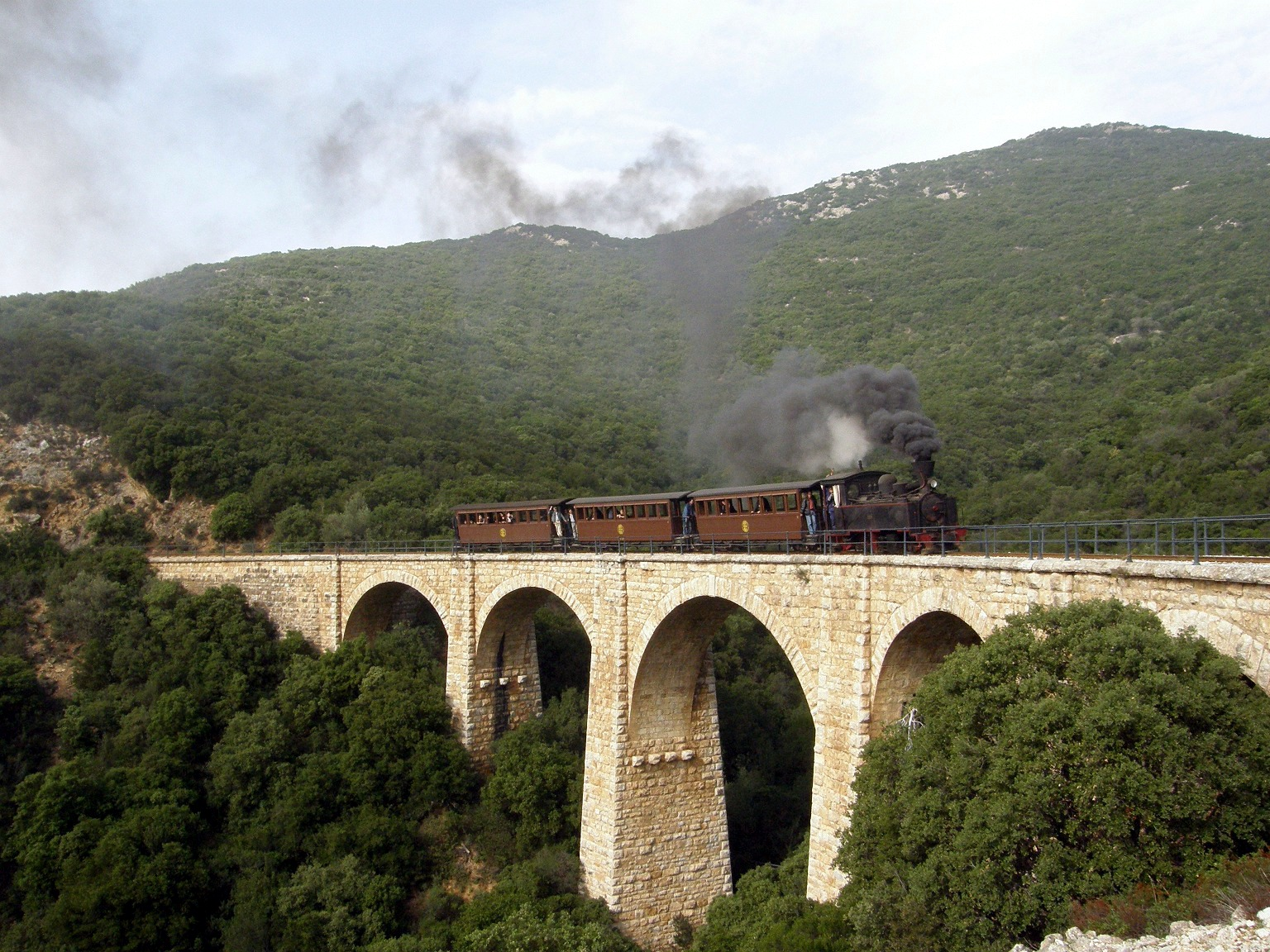
A Tubize narrow gauge (600 mm) locomotive hauls a charter train from Ano Lechonia to Miliés on the Pelion Railway

The Pelion railway, dating back to 1892–1903, was the first serious public investment in the area. Electricity, radio and automobiles were first introduced in the 1950s except for Volos, which had those utilities from earlier times. Television arrived in the 1970s and the 1980s and computers and Internet in the late 1990s. The northern part of the Pelion mountains was struck by a forest fire (see Summer 2007 Wildfires in Greece) on June 26, 2007, which started in Siki and damaged its forests, mostly at the middle part of the mountain. The fire lasted for several days and stopped on July 1. Several villages were damaged. As of late August, however, a natural rebirth of the forest was already being noticed, with several trees gradually turning green again, as well as bushes appearing on the ground.

== Communications ==
The mountain has a telecommunications tower that broadcasts radio and television including ANT1, Mega, ERT, Star Channel, Alter, TRT and more and radio including ERA, ANT1 FM and many more.

== Panorama ==
A panorama from Pelion offers a views of the valley, the mountains of western Magnesia, Mount Olympus, the plain of Thessaly and its nearby mountains, Mavrovouni, Euboea, Central Greece and the northern Sporades islands. Depending on the humidity of the atmosphere, visitors can view the mountains of Agio Oros.

== Places ==
Modern Pelion's twenty-four villages retain traditional Pelian architecture and construction, with stone buildings made out of expertly carved local grey, blue, or green slate and red clay. They are built on terraces on the slopes and offer stunning vistas of the surrounding slopes and the sea. Houses are usually multi-storied and feature the characteristic Pelian oriel construction, with tall windows and abundant painted ornamentation. Pelian tradition calls for three-level houses, with the ground floor used for work (tools, kitchen, storage, washing, weaving), the middle floor used for socializing (common rooms), and the top floor for private rooms (bedrooms). Heat is provided by fireplaces, the chimneys of which run through the walls to provide heat to the upper levels, whereas the top level, being well ventilated, provides for summertime cooling. Interior construction is usually of chestnut timber, stained dark brown and often elaborately carved. Many of the larger Pelian mansions (the arkhontiká or "lordly mansions") have been converted into boutique hotels and hostels. The largest of all the stone buildings, which serve as points of reference for the locals, are the Pelion Towers. These are huge 300-year-old buildings with exquisite visual characteristics that combine building elements of Mountain Pelion of the 17th, 18th and 19th century.

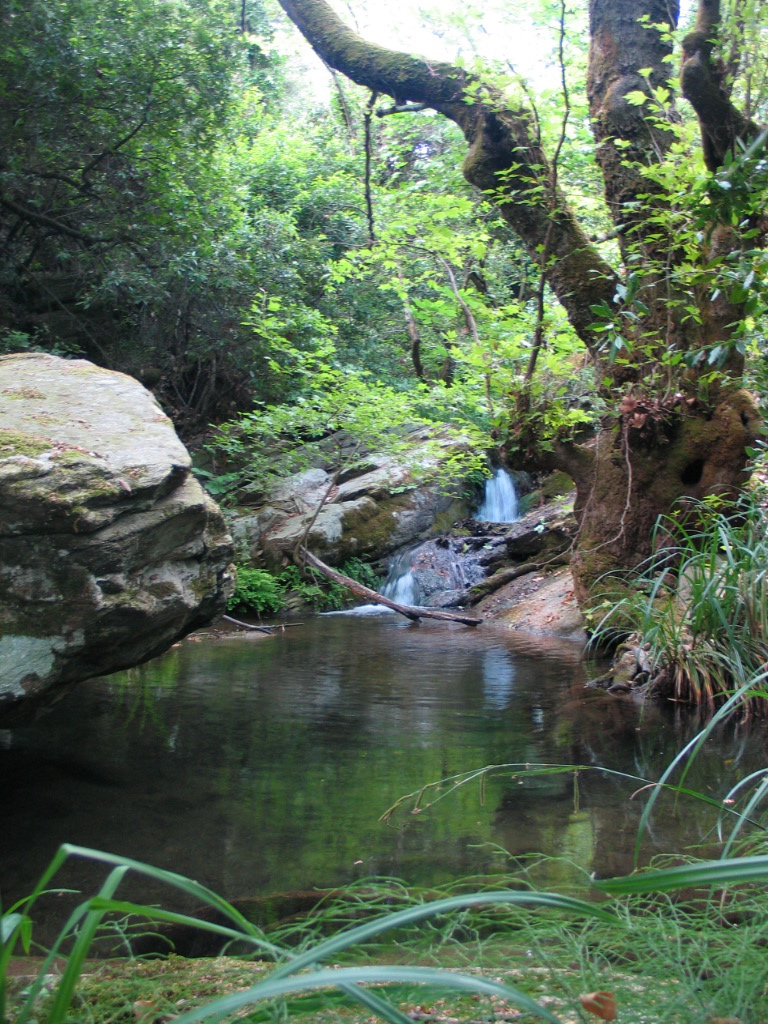
Mt.Pelion is covered in forest

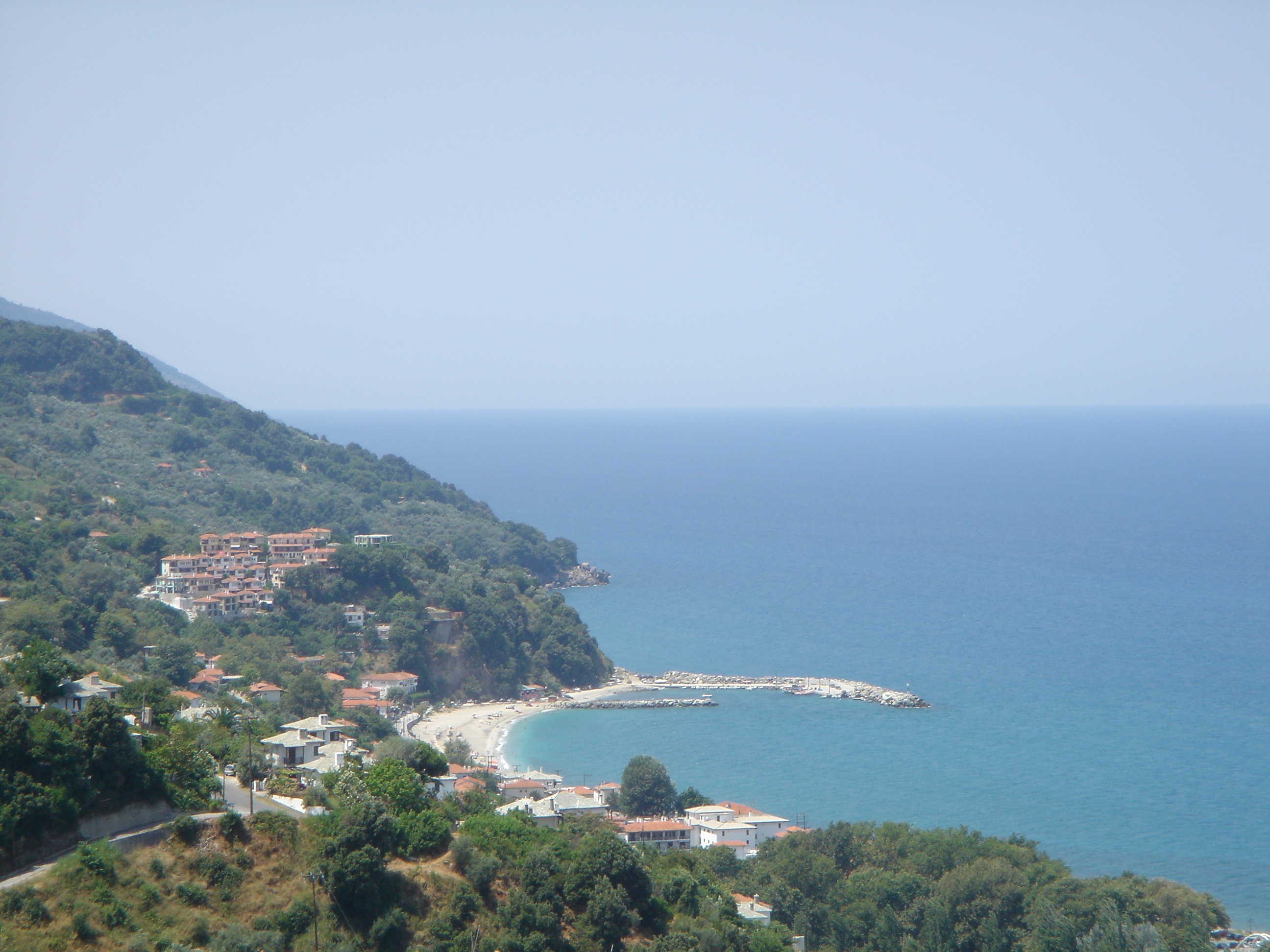
Beach of Agios Ioannis

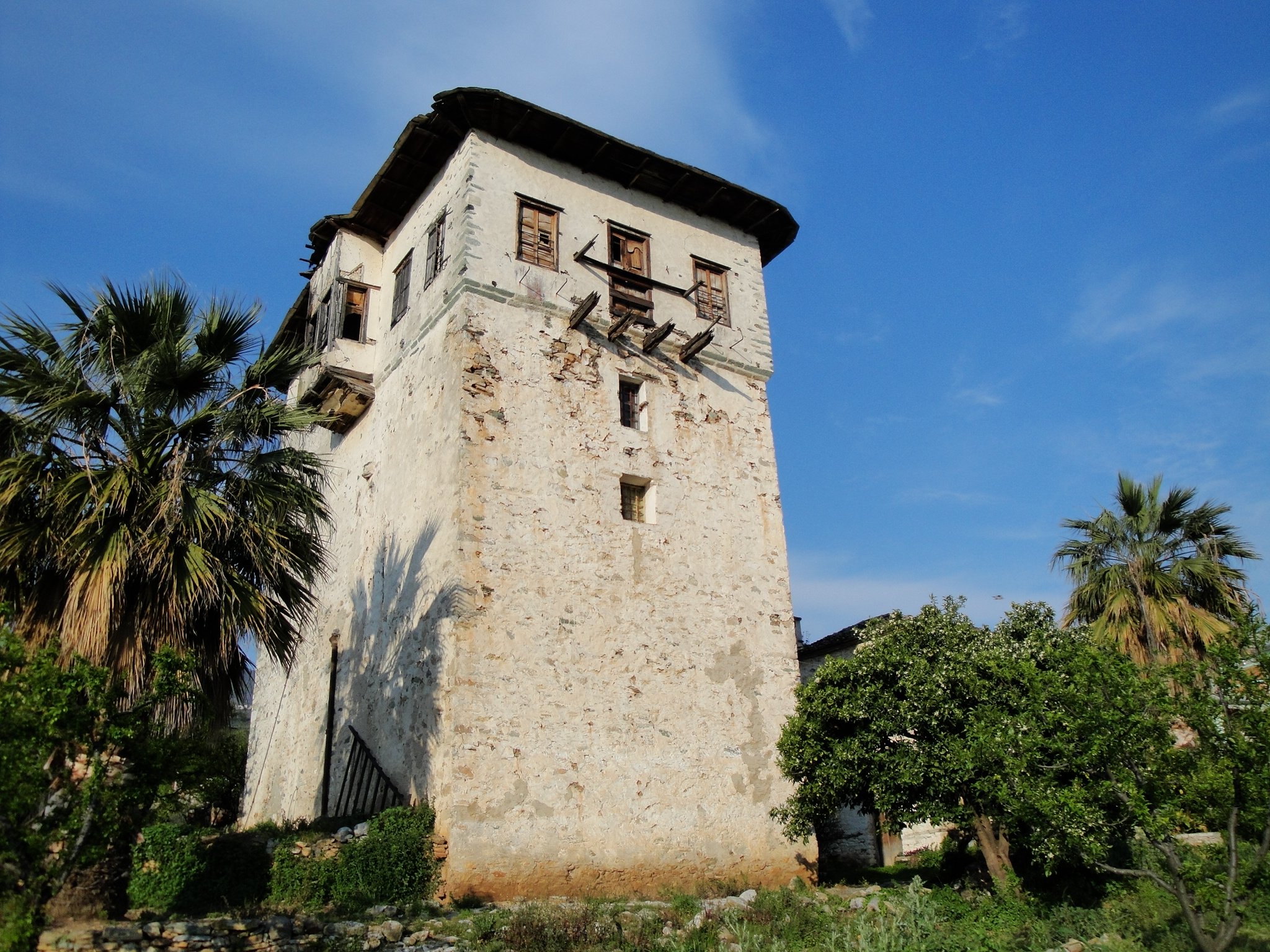
The Pelion towers (Olympiou tower-Russian consulate during Ottoman era)

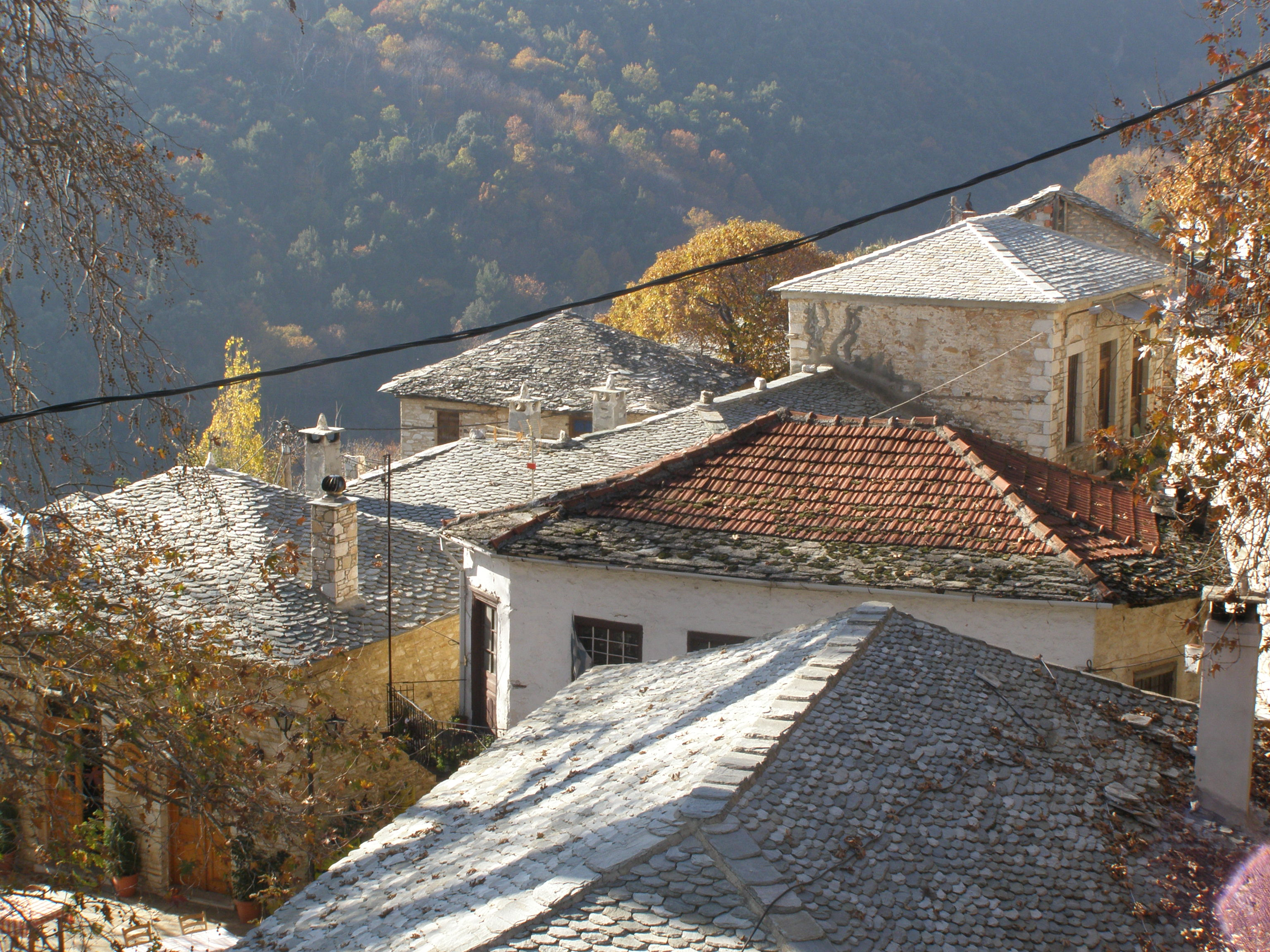
Pinakates

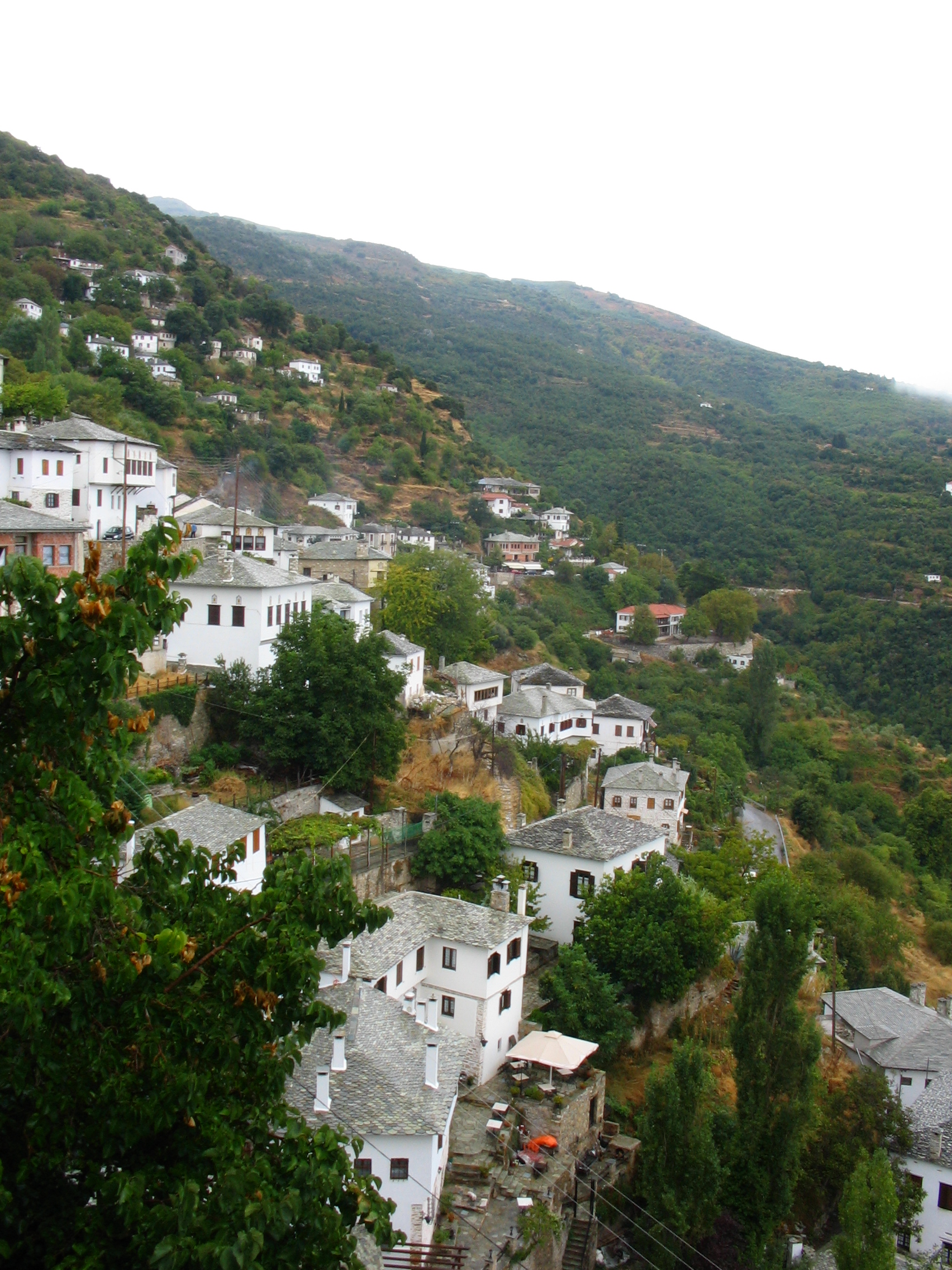
Makrinitsa

Today, Mt. Pelion is part of the Magnesia regional unit (capital city: Volos) and embraces twenty-six villages including:

Most significant:

- Agios Georgios Nileias
- Agios Lavrentios
- Argalasti
- Makrinitsa
- Milies
- Mouresi
- Portaria
- Lafkos
- Tsangarada
- Vyzitsa
- Zagora

Others:

- Agios Dimitrios
- Anilio
- Artemida
- Drakeia
- Kala Nera
- Kanalia
- Kissos
- Neochori
- Pinakates
- Promyri
- Vlasios
- Trikeri
- Xinovrysi
- Milina
- Xorto

== See also ==
- Drakeia massacre
- Museum of Folk Art and History of Pelion
- Pelion railway
