= Drakeia massacre =

Nazi atrocity in Greece during WWII

Coordinates: 39.376°N 23.050°E

Drakeia Massacre
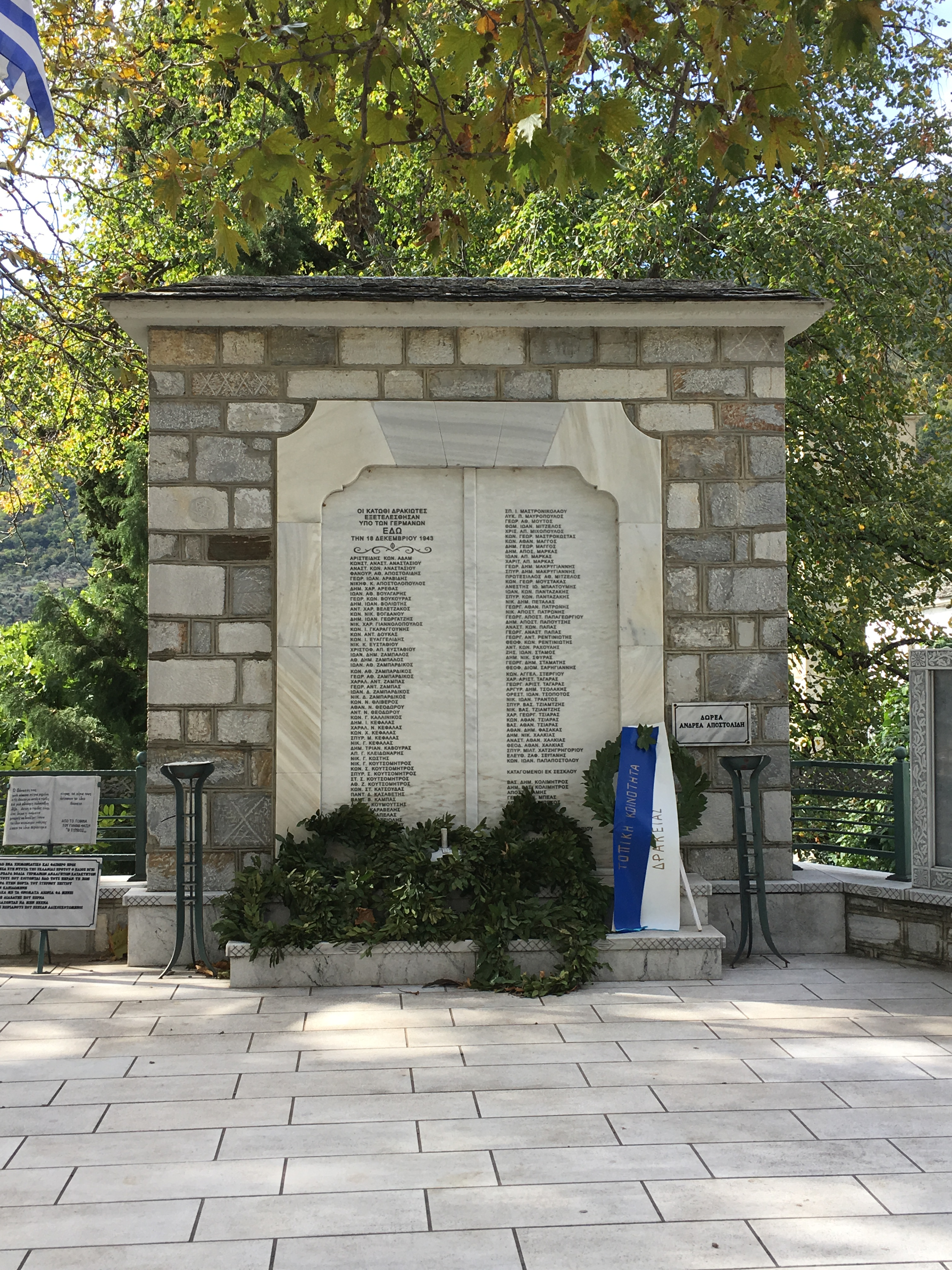
- Monument in memory of the 115 victims of the 1943 massacre in Drakeia, Mount Pelion, Greece.
- Location: Drakeia, Mount Pelion, Greece
- Date: 18 December 1943
- Target: Civilians
- Attack type: Mass murder
- Deaths: 115
- Perpetrator: 4th SS Polizei Panzergrenadier Division
- Motive: Nazi reprisals
- Inquiry: None
- Accused: None
- Convicted: None

The Drakeia massacre (Greek: Η σφαγή της Δράκειας) refers to the mass execution of 115 men by SS soldiers in the village of Drakeia, located on Mount Pelion, in Thessaly, on 18 December 1943. It was part of the multiple Nazi reprisals against the Greek Resistance in occupied Greece.

A wake in memory of the victims is held in the area every year, in the presence of members of the Greek Parliament, members of the Government of Greece and other dignitaries.
