= Mouresi =

Mouresi Μουρέσι
- Municipal unit
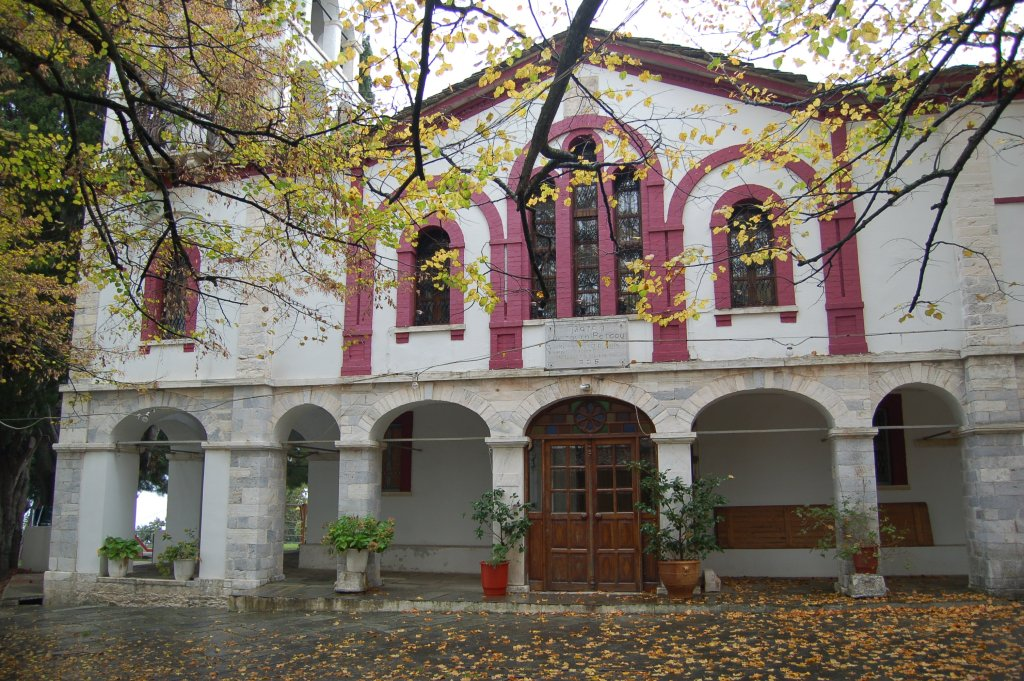
- Mouresi, Agia Triada church

- Location within the regional unit

- Location within Greece
- Coordinates: 39°24′N 23°10′E
- Country: Greece
- Administrative region: Thessaly
- Regional unit: Magnesia
- Municipality: Zagora-Mouresi

Area
  - Municipal unit: 54.2 km^{2} (20.9 sq mi)
- Highest elevation: 800 m (2,600 ft)
- Lowest elevation: 0 m (0 ft)

Population (2021)
  - Municipal unit: 1,787
  - Municipal unit density: 33.0/km^{2} (85.4/sq mi)
  - Community: 402
- Time zone: UTC+2 (EET)
  - Summer (DST): UTC+3 (EEST)
- Postal code: 370 12
- Area code: 24230
- Vehicle registration: ΒΟ

Mouresi (Greek: Μουρέσι) is a village and a former municipality in Magnesia, Thessaly, Greece. It is situated in the northeastern part of the Pelion peninsula. Since the 2011 local government reform it is part of the municipality Zagora-Mouresi, of which it is a municipal unit. The municipal unit has an area of 54.214 km^{2}. The seat of the municipality was in Tsagkarada.

== Subdivisions ==
The municipal unit Mouresi is subdivided into the following communities (constituent villages in brackets):

- Agios Dimitrios Piliou (Agios Dimitrios, Agios Ioannis)
- Anilio (Anilio, Plaka)
- Kissos
- Mouresi (Mouresi, Agios Ioannis, Damouchari)
- Tsagkarada (Tsagkarada, Mylopotamos)
- Xorychti (Xorychti, Kato Xorychti)

== Geography ==
The municipal unit Mouresi covers the northeastern part of the Pelion peninsula, and is situated on the eastern side of the Pelion mountains, on the Aegean Sea coast. The area is mountainous and densely forested. The largest village is Tsagkarada (population 525 in 2011). The village Mouresi lies at 310 m elevation, 1.5 km northwest of Tsagkarada, 2 km southeast of Agios Dimitrios and 7 km southeast of Zagora.

== Historical population ==
Year	Community	Municipal unit
1991	-	3,239
2001	588	3,107
2011	548	2,475
2021	402	1,787
