= Saint Triantaphyllos =

Greek Orthodox saint (1663–1680)

Child Martyr
- Born: 1663; Zagora (modern-day Greece)
- Died: 8 August 1680 (aged 16–17); Constantinople (modern-day Istanbul, Turkey)
- Venerated in: Eastern Orthodox Church
- Feast: 8 August

Triantaphyllos the Martyr (1663 – August 8, 1680) is a martyr and saint of the Eastern Orthodox Church. He was born in Zagora, in then Ottoman-controlled Greece, and was taken captive by the Turks one day while he was working as a fisherman. He was tortured when he refused to renounce his Christian faith and convert to Islam and was eventually beheaded by his captors.

== Bibliography ==
- Παπαδόπουλος, Χρυσόστομος (1922). Οι νεομάρτυρες [The Neomartyrs] (in Greek). Athens.
