= Amaliapoli =

Amaliapoli Αμαλιάπολη
- Community
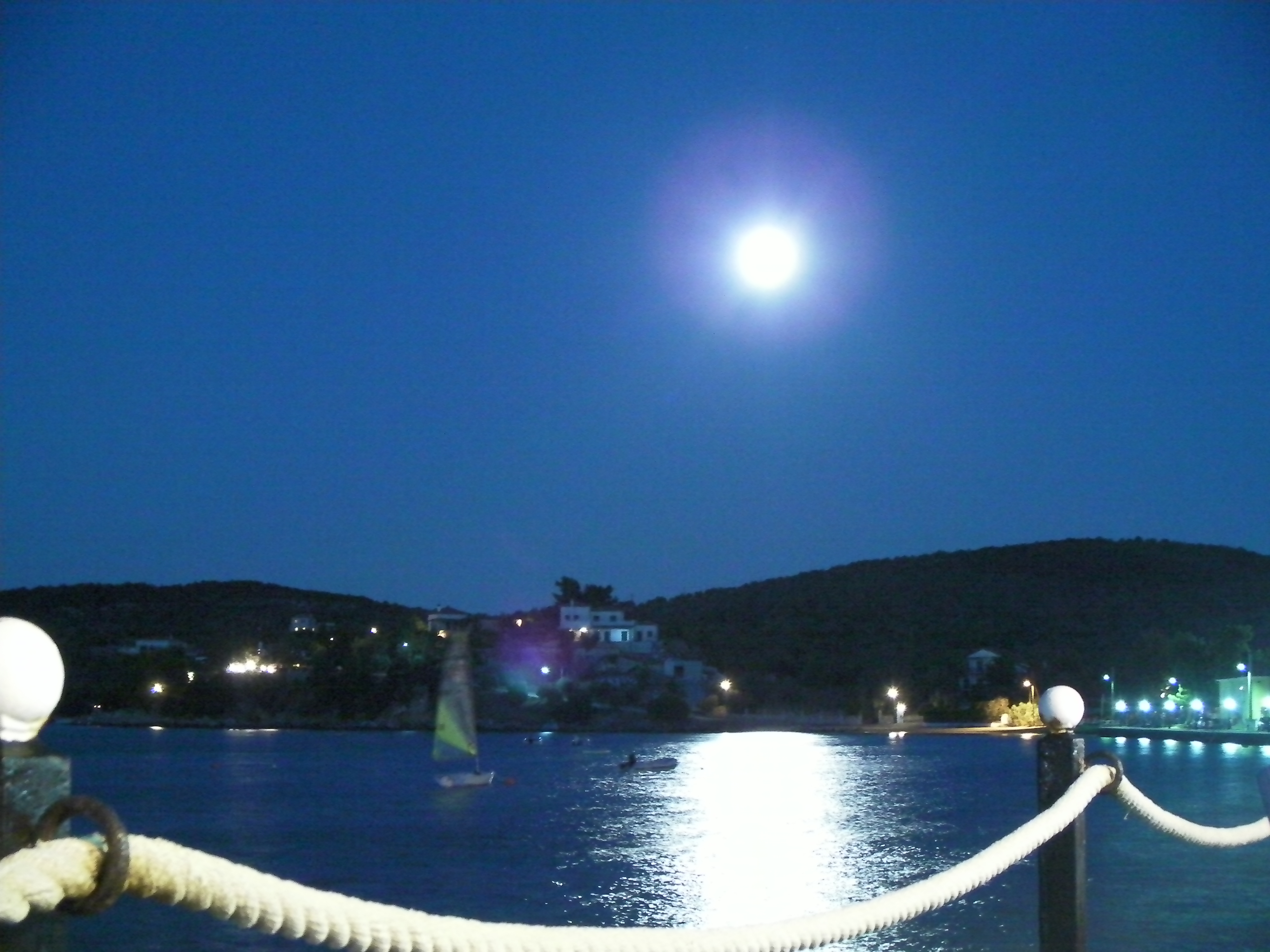

- Location within Greece
- Coordinates: 39°10′03″N 22°53′17″E
- Country: Greece
- Administrative region: Thessaly
- Regional unit: Magnesia
- Municipality: Almyros
- Municipal unit: Sourpi

Population (2021)
  - Community: 383
- Time zone: UTC+2 (EET)
  - Summer (DST): UTC+3 (EEST)

Amaliapoli (Greek: Αμαλιάπολη) is a village at the western part of the Pagasetic Gulf, in the Magnesia regional unit of Greece, also known as Nea Mintzela. It was the northernmost border village of the newly independent Greek state, and was named after Queen Amalia, the first queen of the modern Greek state, in the 1840s. Amaliapoli was the place of origin of the Kalamidas family, a family which played a notable role in the region of Mintzela during the Greek Revolution against the Turks 1821.
