= Anavra =

Anavra Ανάβρα
- Municipal unit
- Location within the regional unit

- Location within Greece
- Coordinates: 39°4′N 22°32′E
- Country: Greece
- Administrative region: Thessaly
- Regional unit: Magnesia
- Municipality: Almyros

Area
  - Municipal unit: 121.9 km^{2} (47.1 sq mi)
- Elevation: 780 m (2,560 ft)

Population (2021)
  - Municipal unit: 405
  - Municipal unit density: 3.32/km^{2} (8.60/sq mi)
- Time zone: UTC+2 (EET)
  - Summer (DST): UTC+3 (EEST)
- Postal code: 35 010
- Area code: +30 22320

Anavra (Greek: Ανάβρα) is a village and a former community in Magnesia, Thessaly, Greece. Since the 2011 local government reform, it has been part of the municipality Almyros, of which it is a municipal unit. The municipal unit has an area of 121.859 km^{2}. According to the census of 2021, the population of Anavra was 405 citizens. The village of Anavra is located on the west side of Mount Othrys, at a height of 900 metres (3,000 ft) above sea level, 72 kilometres (45 mi) from Magnesia's administrative center of Volos and close to the border of Phthiotis. The Enipeas river, which is a tributary of the Pineios, starts at the springs of Anavra and passes through the village for two kilometres.

According to mythology, Anavra is connected with livestock activities. Almost all the inhabitants are employed in farming and herding.

== Economy ==
In the 1970s mules were the only form of transport available in Anavra, and the nearest school, in Lamia, was a 6-hour ride away. Since the 1990s the village has been transformed by mayor Dimitris Tsoukalas, who successfully sought EU development funding.

In 2010, Anavra had among the highest GDP per capita of any settlement in Greece and the rest of the EU with typical incomes ranging from 30,000 to 100,000 euros, with an average household income of €70,000. The village was recognized as a model of sustainable development, producing its own electricity by 20 wind-powered generators. Surplus electrical power was sold. A hydroelectric plant was scheduled for construction, and a biomass facility was being planned which will supply heat and hot water from animal manure and woodchips. The plan called for all homes and buildings in the town to be connected to this heat/hot water network. All these projects were stalled and eventually cancelled with the inclusion of the village in the greater Almyros municipality, due to the "Kallikratis" reform. The overhead produced by the "kapodistrias" community era is gradually being diminished.

Plans are being proposed for the creation of a winter ski centre on the slopes of Mount Othrys and its highest peak, Gerakovouni (1726 m), west of the village.

== Sites of Interest ==
- Saint Dimitrios church
- The Folklore Museum of Farming Life.
- The waterfalls of Enipeas
- Othry mountain and its rich flora

== General information ==
- Community office, Tel: 22320 91382
- Communal Library, Tel: 22320 91210
- Folklore Museum of Farming Life, Tel: 22320 91210

== See also ==
- List of towns and villages of Greece
