= Promyri =

Promyri Προμύρι
- Community
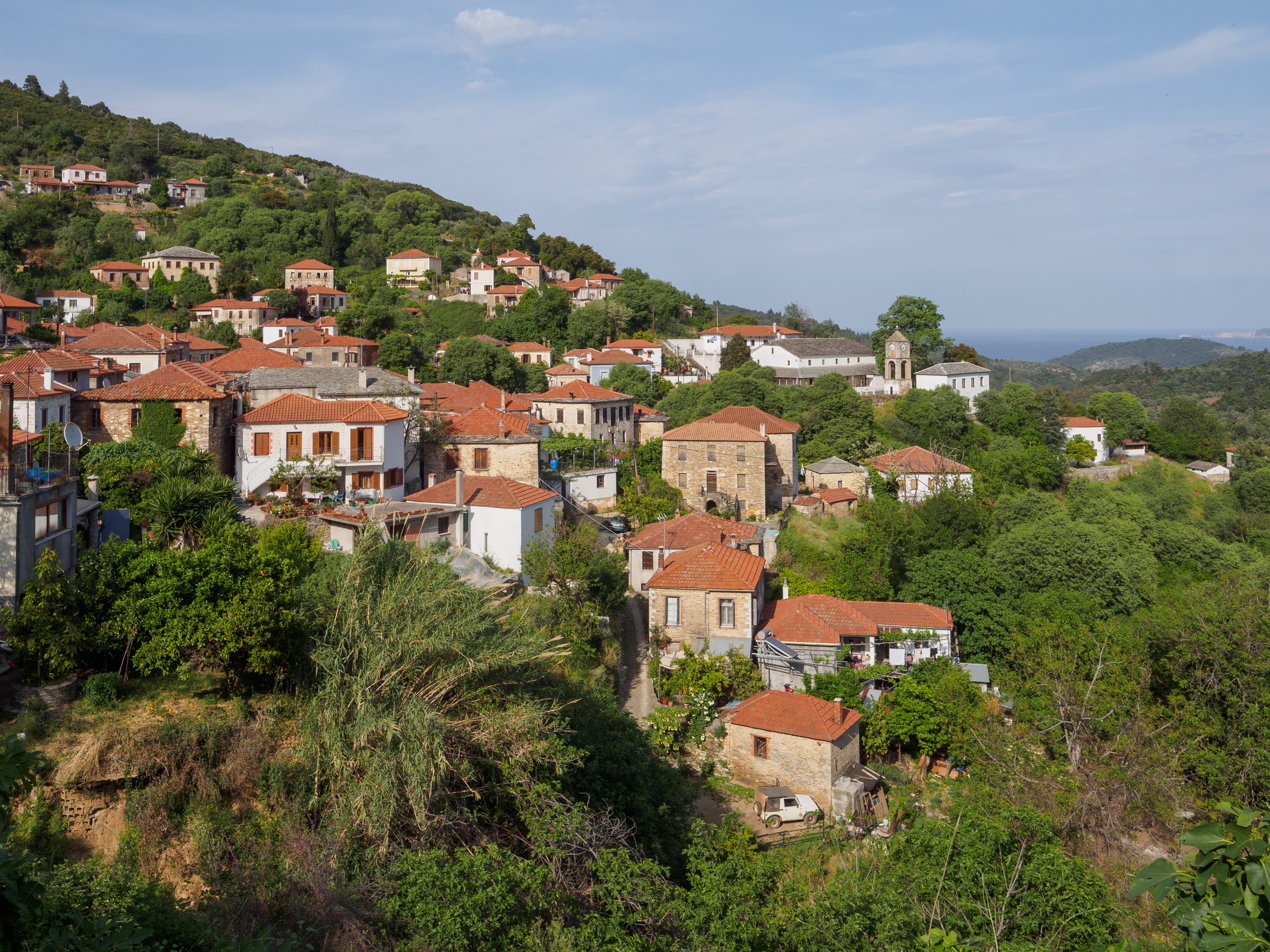

- Location within Greece
- Coordinates: 39°11′N 23°17′E
- Country: Greece
- Administrative region: Thessaly
- Regional unit: Magnesia
- Municipality: South Pelion
- Municipal unit: Sipiada

Population (2021)
  - Community: 615
- Time zone: UTC+2 (EET)
  - Summer (DST): UTC+3 (EEST)

Promyri (Greek: Προμύρι) is a village in Magnesia, Greece. The stone-built village of Promyri clings to the steep hillsides of a long valley reaching the sea at Katigiorgis. The main road bypasses the village so it is quiet and free from traffic. The narrow streets are made of cobblestone and are surrounded by trees providing shade from the sun. The island of Skiathos can be seen from the centre of the village. The old houses are built from stone and date from the late 19th century. Others were built at the turn of the 20th century in a neoclassical style and are linked by stone footpaths between gardens filled with flowers. Promyri has a small grocery shop that also serves as a post office. In the main square there's a great restaurant, a bar (kafenion) and a pharmacy. All of those are located on or near the main square, where a vast old platan tree provides lots of shade. Near the main square there are also two old water sources where some of the women in the village still do their laundry. At one time, the village had many silk weavers but as the trade diminished, this was replaced by agriculture.
