= Artemida, Magnesia =

Artemida Αρτέμιδα
- Municipal unit
- Location within the regional unit

- Location within Greece
- Coordinates: 39°29′N 23°05′E
- Country: Greece
- Administrative region: Thessaly
- Regional unit: Magnesia
- Municipality: Volos

Area
  - Municipal unit: 28.8 km^{2} (11.1 sq mi)
- Elevation: 70 m (230 ft)

Population (2021)
  - Municipal unit: 3,595
  - Municipal unit density: 125/km^{2} (323/sq mi)
- Time zone: UTC+2 (EET)
  - Summer (DST): UTC+3 (EEST)
- Postal code: 37800
- Area code: 24280
- Vehicle registration: ΒΟ

Artemida (Greek: Αρτέμιδα) is a former municipality in Magnesia, Thessaly, Greece. Since the 2011 local government reform it is part of the municipality Volos, of which it is a municipal unit. The municipal unit has an area of 28.791 km^{2}. Population 3,595 (2021). The seat of the municipality was in Ano Lechonia. The name of the municipality comes from the ancient goddess Artemis, since the goddess, when she went out hunting, preferred mountains and rocky precipices.
