= Zagora-Mouresi =

Zagora–Mouresi Ζαγορά-Μουρέσι
- Municipality
- Zagora-Mouresi municipality

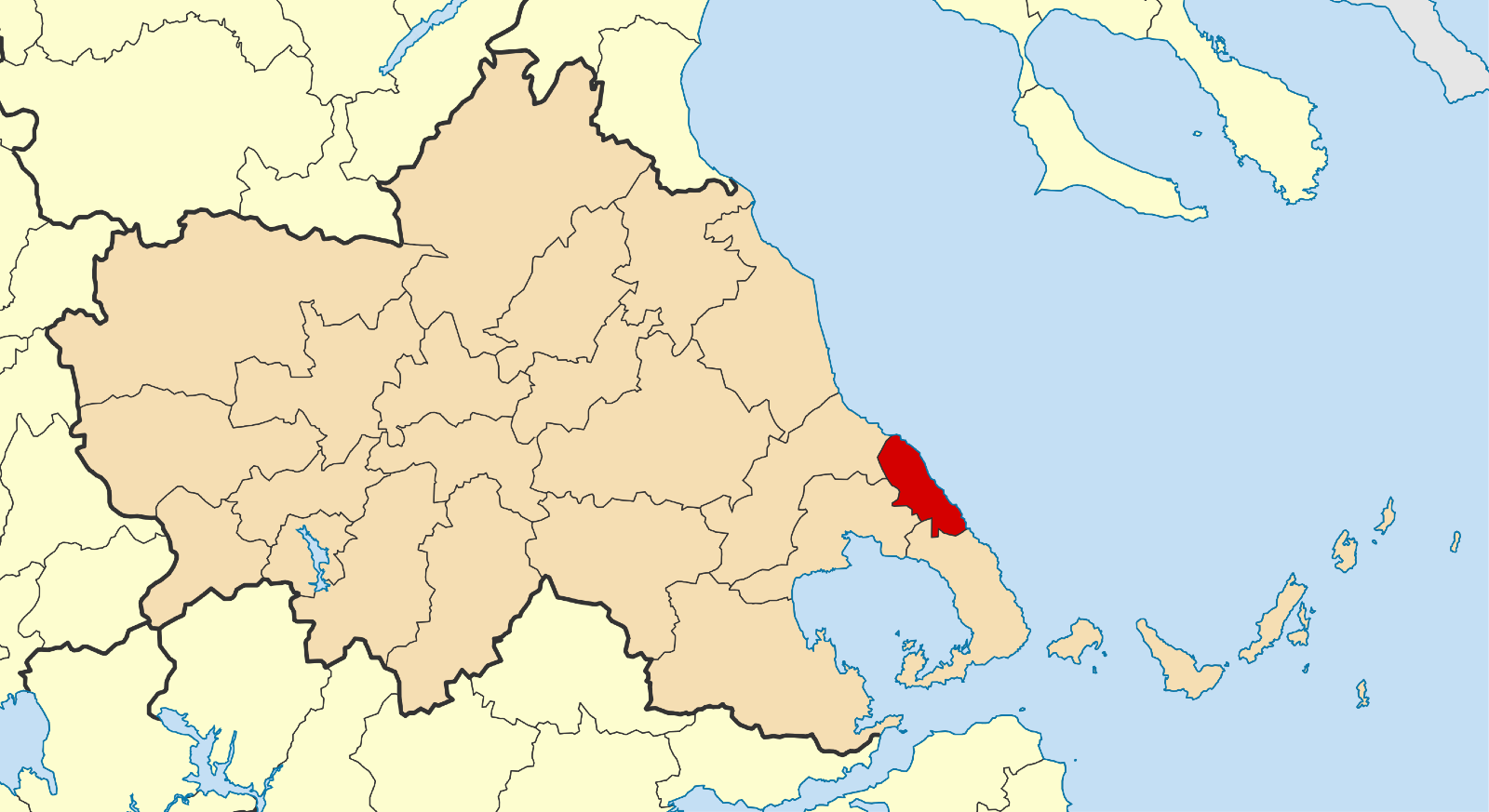

- Location within Greece
- Coordinates: 39°27′N 23°5′E
- Country: Greece
- Administrative region: Thessaly
- Regional unit: Magnesia

Area
  - Municipality: 150.3 km^{2} (58.0 sq mi)

Population (2021)
  - Municipality: 4,562
  - Density: 30.35/km^{2} (78.61/sq mi)
- Time zone: UTC+2 (EET)
  - Summer (DST): UTC+3 (EEST)

Zagora–Mouresi (Greek: Ζαγορά-Μουρέσι, [zaɣoˈra-muˈresi]) is a municipality in the Magnesia regional unit, Thessaly, Greece. The seat of the municipality is the town Zagora. The municipality has an area of 150.315 km^{2}.

== Municipality ==
The municipality Zagora–Mouresi was formed at the 2011 local government reform by the merger of the following 2 former municipalities, that became municipal units:

- Mouresi
- Zagora
