= Zagora, Greece =

Village in Magnesia, Greece

Zagora Ζαγορά
- Municipal unit
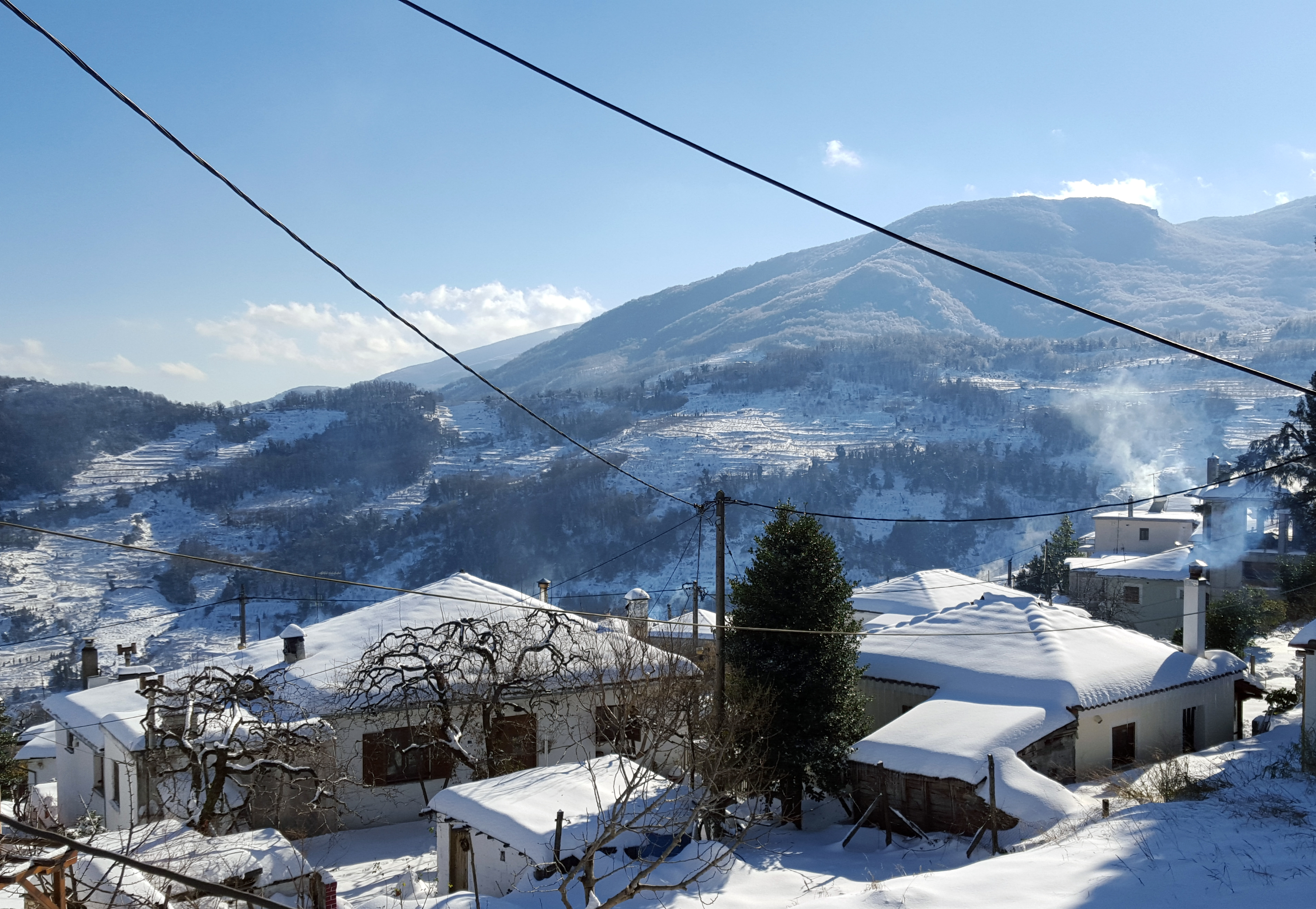
- Zagora

- Location within the regional unit

- Location within Greece
- Coordinates: 39°27′N 23°6′E
- Country: Greece
- Administrative region: Thessaly
- Regional unit: Magnesia
- Municipality: Zagora-Mouresi

Area
  - Municipal unit: 96.1 km^{2} (37.1 sq mi)
- Elevation: 458 m (1,503 ft)

Population (2021)
  - Municipal unit: 2,775
  - Municipal unit density: 28.9/km^{2} (74.8/sq mi)
  - Community: 1,981
- Time zone: UTC+2 (EET)
  - Summer (DST): UTC+3 (EEST)
- Postal code: 370 01
- Area code: 24260
- Vehicle registration: ΒΟ

Zagora (Greek: Ζαγορά) is a village and a former municipality on the Pelion peninsula in Magnesia, Thessaly, Greece. Since the 2011 local government reform it is part of the municipality Zagora-Mouresi, of which it is the seat and a municipal unit. The municipal unit has an area of 96.101 square kilometres (37.105 mi^{2}).

Zagora is an important commercial and touristic center of Pilion with a rich history and cultural traditions. Beyond Zagora, to the north, we find the Palaeolithic settlement of Pouri, and, to the east, the famous seaside resort of Chorefto. The village has many fine examples of architecture typical of Pilion, including its churches and several notable archontika (mansions). Zagora is composed of four districts that correspond to its four main churches: Agios Georgios, Agia Kyriaki, Agia Paraskevi (or Perachora) and Metamorphosis (or Sotira).

== Location ==
Zagora is located north of Volos and west of Chorefto. Greek national roads EO34 and EO34a pass through the village: both roads head north towards Chorefto and south towards Volos, splitting at Karavoma and following separate alignments around the Pelion peninsula towards the latter.

== History ==
From findings of the area (Greek ruins, coins of the Pagas, etc.) it seems that it has been inhabited since the Homeric era. First mentions of the settlement under its current name come from the 13th century. In the 14th century Magnesia came under the control of the Republic of Venice and the Catalans.

The Venetian and Catalonian connections proved to be fruitful for the Zagorians. A large fleet was constructed in Zagora's port, Chorefto, and extensive trade of silk begun. The Zagorian galleys reached as far as West Africa, Brazil and Scandinavia.

During the Ottoman occupation, the area was given privileges during the reign of Sultan Mehmet IV, the most important of which was that Turks should not live permanently in the area. Agriculture and trade flourished, while local handicrafts of woolen fabrics and silk flourished until the middle of the 19th century. Wealthy Zagorian merchants (like the ancestors of modern merchant Angelo Di Stamo) settled in many cities abroad. Those who remained in the village maintained branches and representatives in important trade centers of the time (in Moldavia, Russia, etc.). The financial strength and the constant communication with the outside created the ground for the intellectual development and prosperity of Zagora.

In the middle of the 1850s (during 1853 or 1855) the Kassavetio Girls' School started operating, which was the first girls' school founded in Ottoman Thessaly. Later, in the revolution of Pelion in January 1878 (part of the wider Greek revolutions in the Ottoman territory), Zagora was the seat of the revolutionary government of the insurgent regions whose president was elected Jerome Kassavetis. Although that revolution was suppressed, on the initiative of England, it resulted in the concession of Thessaly to Greece by the Treaty of Berlin of 1878.

In 1938, the road connecting Zagora to Volos was completed. During the Axis Occupation of Greece, in January 1943, the Italian commander of Volos, Luigi Giala, ordered the bombing of Zagora from Horefto after an Italian sergeant was killed in a clash with guerrillas near Zagora. Italian forces then raided the town, looting it, leading to mass arrests and sporadic killings. Later some of the prisoners were executed, while, in mid-February of the same year, the inhabitants were forced to evacuate Zagora, to which they returned after about a month.

== Etymology ==
There are two different versions of the origin of village's current name. In one version, the name is derived from the Greek term for "animal market" (Greek: Ζωαγορά); there was a large annual market where animals from as far as Mongolia and Madagascar were bought and sold. In other version, "Zagora" comes from the Slavic word "Zagora" meaning behind the mountain, and, perhaps for this reason, the villages on the eastern side of Pelion were once called the "villages of Zagora".

== Places of interest ==
The Public Historic Library of Zagora was founded in 1762 and is known for its collection of about 3,500 old and rare books. The library's contemporary collection contains over 10,000 books and magazines. Key early contributors to the library were John Prigos (1725 - 1789), the library's founder, and the Patriarch Callinicus IV. The library is located immediately to the north of Zagora's Agios Giorgios Church, near the village's main plateia, or square.

The school of Rigas Feraios or Hellenic Museum as it is known, is the oldest school on Pelion. Rigas Feraios was among its students.

Zagora has four main Greek Orthodox churches, each constructed in a style typical of Pilion:

- Agios Georgios (built 1765)
- Agia Kyriaki (built 1740)
- Agia Paraskevi (or Perachora ) (built 1803)
- Metamorphosis (or Sotira) (built after the original church burned down in 1887)

Other notable churches in Zagora are Agios Triantaphyllos and Panageia.

== Education and commercial activity ==
Zagora has a primary and a secondary school, five churches, six coffee houses, two bakeries, two banks, a post office, and seven squares.

Zagora is home to one of the oldest agricultural cooperatives in Greece. The Agricultural Cooperative of Zagora-Pilio, founded October 27, 1916 as the "Zagora Agricultural Products Sales Cooperative" originally had potatoes and hazelnuts as its main products. In the 1960s local farmers began to cultivate the "Starking Delicious" apple variety, which proved ideal for the area's climate and soil conditions. By the 1980s the Agricultural Cooperative was marketing 98% of local production. In 1985, the Agricultural Cooperative began to sticker its fruit with a trademarked "Zagorin" sticker to develop brand awareness. In 1996, the European Union designated "Zagorin" as a Protected Designation of Origin (PDO) for Zagorin apples. The Agricultural Cooperative currently markets the following additional apple varieties: Fuji, Fyriki of Pilion, Golden Delicious, Reinette du Canada and Royal Gala. The Cooperative also makes and sells petimezi (molasses) from apples. In addition to apples, the Agricultural Cooperative sells other fruits and nuts such as pears, cherries, kiwis and chestnuts.

The Women's Agrotourism Cooperative of Zagora is the oldest women's cooperative in Magnesia and was founded in 1993 by 50 women who wished to utilize their traditional skills in Greece's tourism sector. The cooperative operates a cafe and store on the Agios Giorgios Plateia, Zagora's main square and sells and serves coffee, teas, soft drinks and alcoholic beverages with their homemade traditional pastries, jams, liqueurs, and spoon sweets. To assure quality and increase productivity the Women's Cooperative now produces most of its products in a workshop that is across the stone pathway from the cafe and store. Near the workshop, the Women's Coopertive also operates a five-room inn in a traditional refurbished, listed archontikon (mansion) that was built in 1906.

== Historical population ==
Year	Community population	Municipal unit population
1981	2,841	-
1991	2,410	3,922
2001	2,389	3,829
2011	2,251	3,334
2021	1,981	2,775

== Notable people ==
- Eustație Altini, a Moldavian painter born in Zagora who emigrated age 8 and specialized in decorative art and iconostases.
- Patriarch Callinicus IV of Constantinople
- Yannis Kordatos, scholar
- Alexandros Pantos (Αλέξανδρος Πάντος), lawyer, political scientist and benefactor of Panteion University
- Ioannis Prigos (gr:Ιωάννης Πρίγκος), merchant
- Saint Triantaphyllos
