= Magnesia (regional unit) =

Magnesia Περιφερειακή ενότητα Μαγνησίας
- Regional unit
- Municipalities of Magnesia

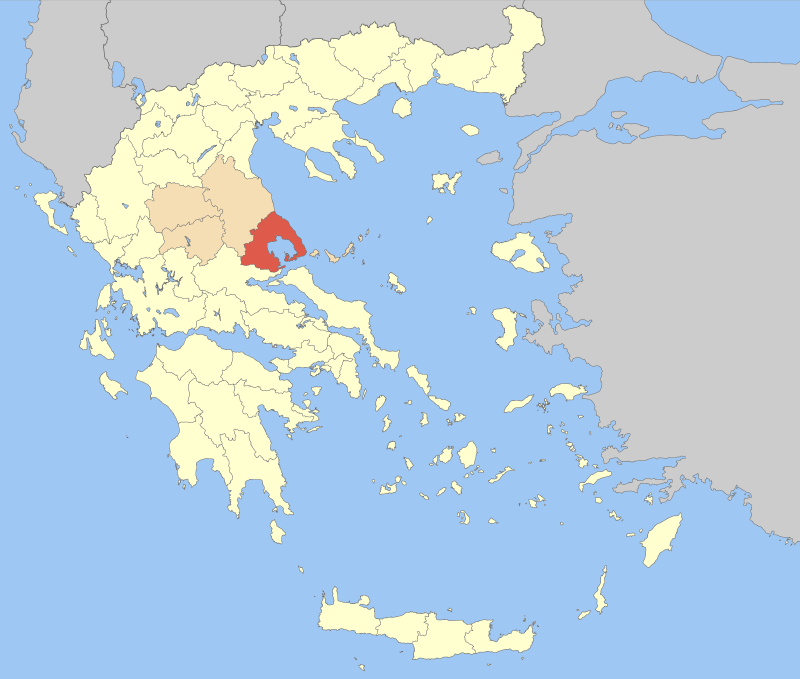
- Magnesia within Greece

- Location within Greece
- Coordinates: 39°25′N 22°50′E
- Country: Greece
- Administrative region: Thessaly
- Seat: Volos

Area
  - Total: 2,367 km^{2} (914 sq mi)

Population (2021)
  - Total: 177,448
  - Density: 74.97/km^{2} (194.2/sq mi)
- Time zone: UTC+2 (EET)
  - Summer (DST): UTC+3 (EEST)
- Postal code: 37x xx, 38x xx
- Area code: 242x0
- Vehicle registration: ΒΟ, BB
- Website: www.magnesia.gr

Magnesia (Greek: Μαγνησία, Magnisía, IPA: [maɣniˈsia], Ancient Greek: Magnēsía, deriving from the tribe name Magnetes) is one of the regional units of Greece. It is part of the region of Thessaly. Its capital is the city of Volos. About 70% of the population of Magnesia live in the Greater Volos area, which is the second-largest city in Thessaly and the third-busiest commercial port in Greece.

According to the most recent census (2021), the population stands at 177,448. The regional unit hosts two million tourists annually. Magnesia is represented in the Greek Parliament by six seats. Its main agricultural products are wheat, cotton, tomatoes, grapes, olives, apples and honey.

== Geography ==
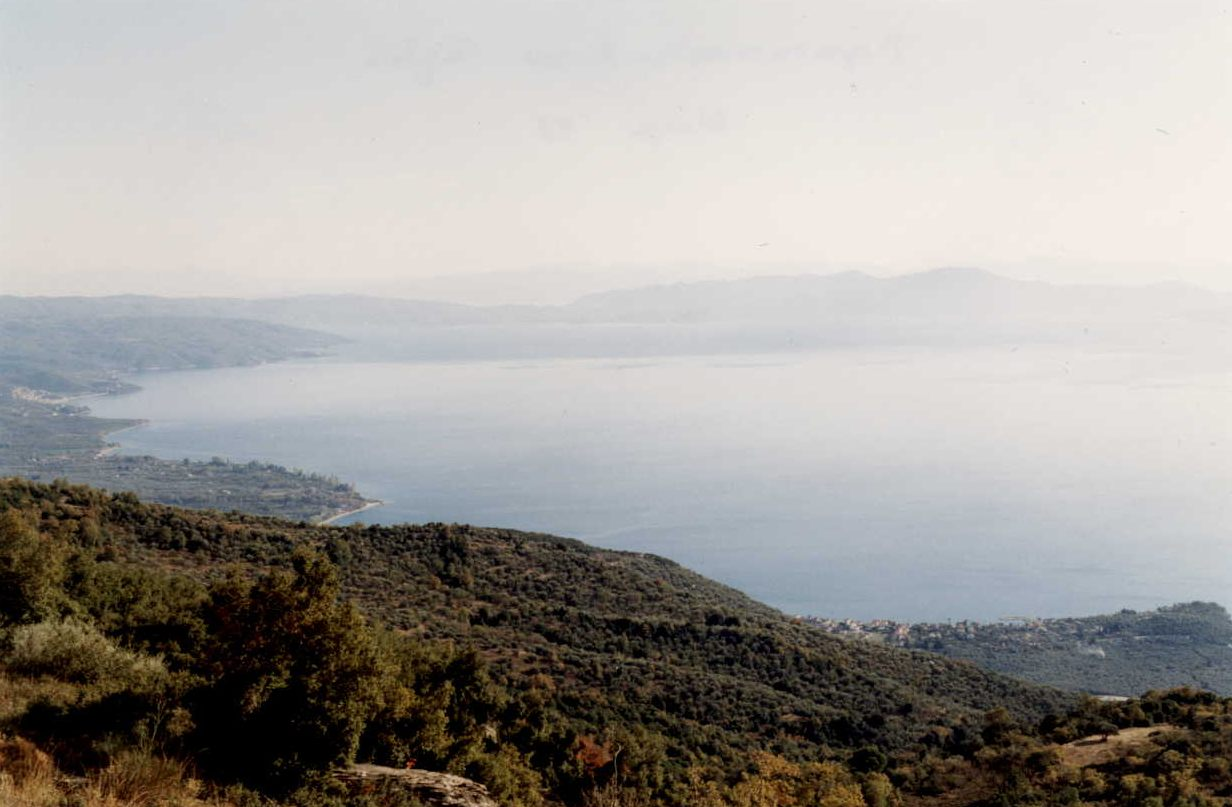
Pagasetic Gulf

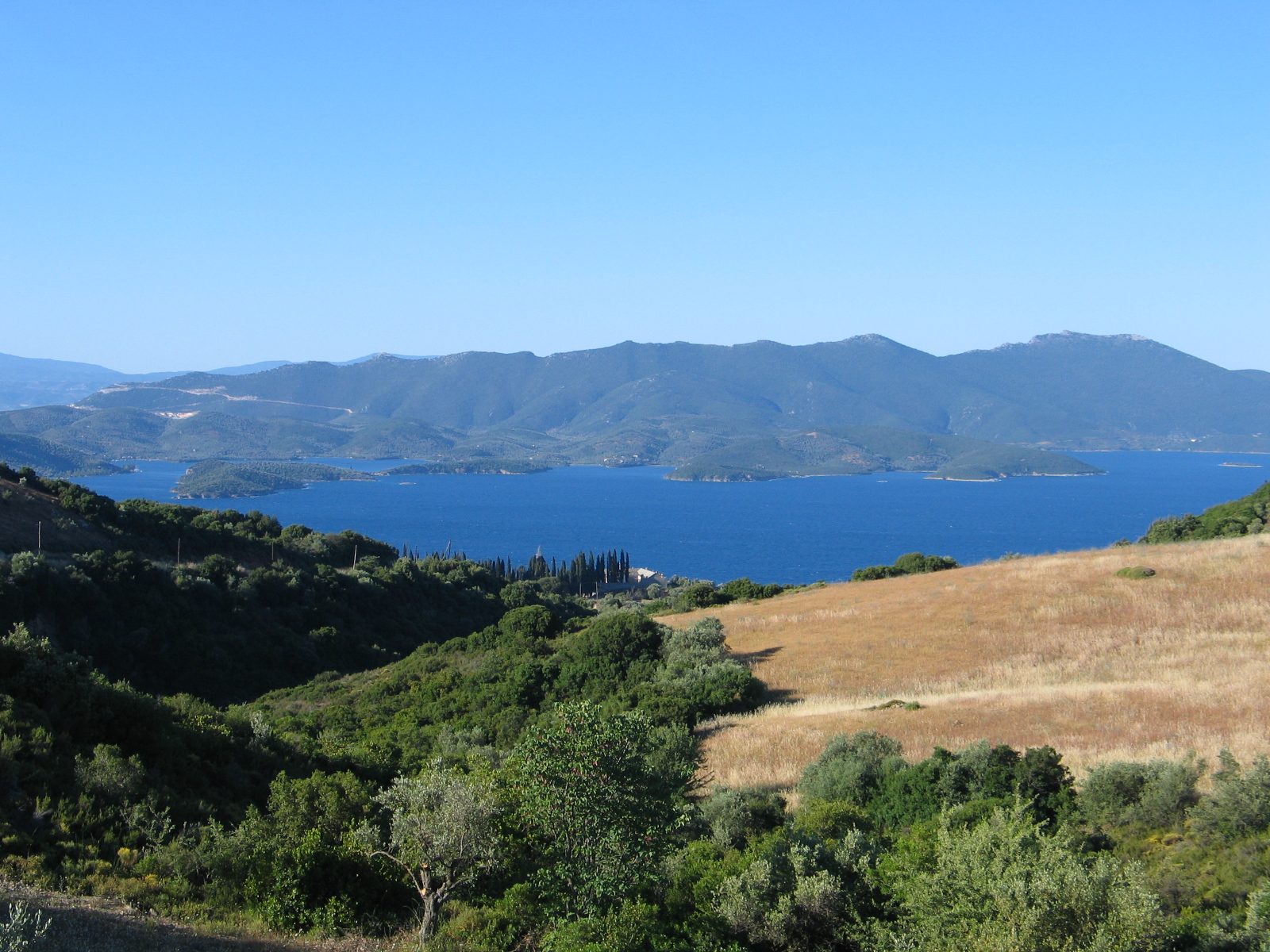
Pelion

A prominent geographic feature of Magnesia is the Pagasetic Gulf, a bay of the Aegean Sea. The Pelion mountain range closes off the Gulf on the east and south side, leaving only a narrow channel near Trikeri. The highest peak of the wooded Pelion is Pourianos Stavros or Xeforti (altitude 1,624 metres or 5,328 feet). On the south edge of Magnesia peninsula Tisaio mountain is found.

Mt. Maurovouni (1,054 metres or 3,458 feet) is the northeasternmost mountain of the regional unit and extends to the neighboring regional unit of Larissa. The southwest border of Magnesia is formed by the Othrys, with its highest peak Gerakovouni (1,726 metres or 5,663 feet). The interior of Magnesia has two plains. The plains southwest of the Pagasetic Gulf are called the Almyros plains, while the plains northwest of the Gulf are called the Volos–Velestino plain. The hydrological network of Magnesia is not particularly rich and is characterized by the absence of big rivers. The waters coming from Pelion shape the rivers Anavros, Platanorema, and Xirias.

In the North section of Magnesia is the shallow Lake Karla. Lake Karla was completely drained in 1962, but as of 2018 water had been restored to at least 50 km^{2} of its former 180 km^{2}. On the bight of Sourpi, next to Amaliapolis a coastal wetland is located, with various species of migratory birds. This wetland together with the forest of Kouri—an infrequent lowland of oak forest close to Almyros—is included in the list of the protected regions of the European Network Natura 2000.

=== Climate ===
The average temperature is 17 degrees Celsius and the average rainfall about 540 millimetres per year. Heat waves and intense cold periods are rare. During the summer the temperature rises up to about 37 to 38 °C (99 to 100 °F) in August. The climate varies in different parts of the prefecture; close to the Pagasetic Gulf conditions are humid, in Nea Ionia it is quite dry and in Velestino and Almyros is the climate is continental. In winter there is significant snowfall in the mountains and often freezing temperatures.

== Administration ==
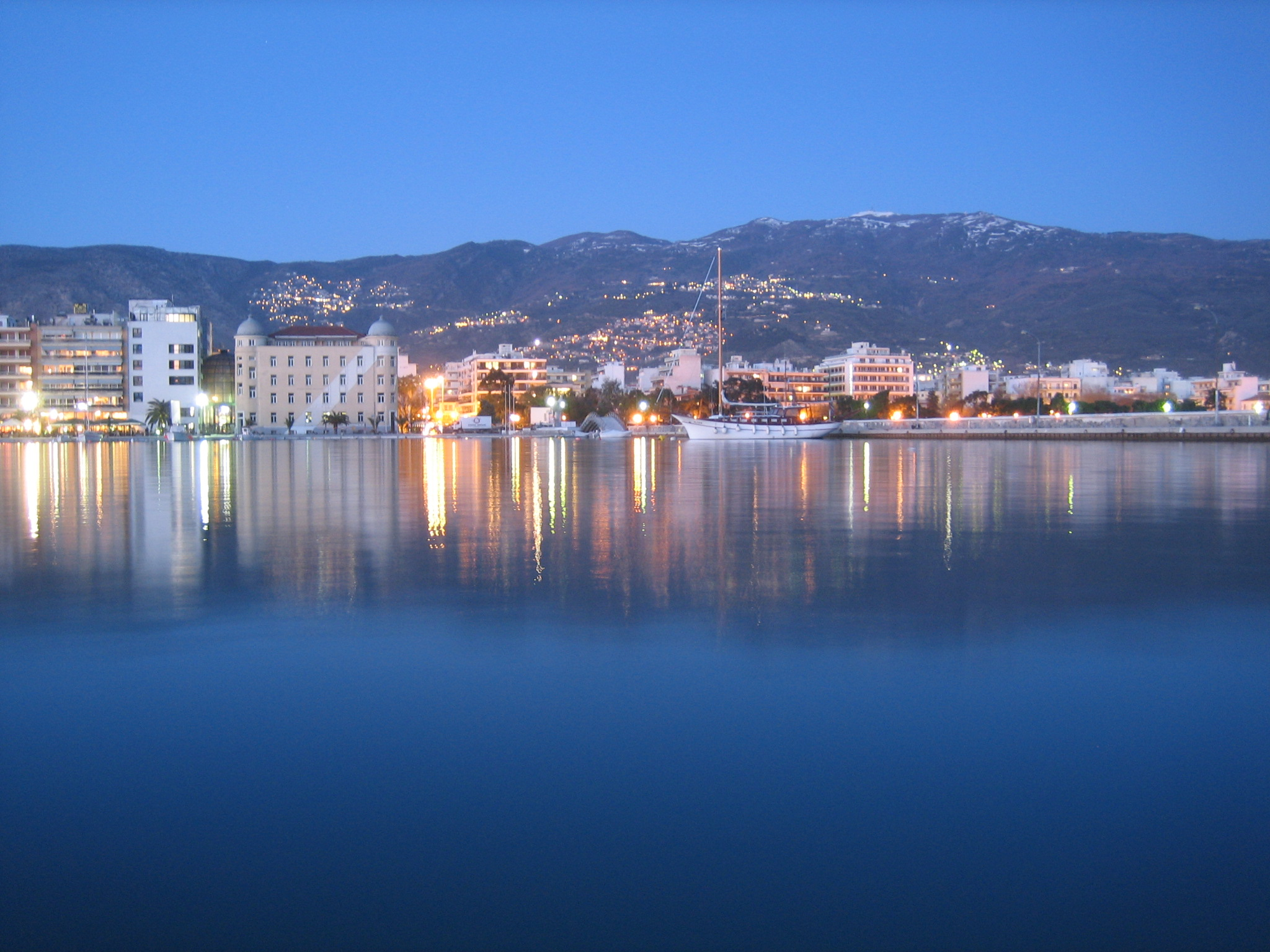
Volos

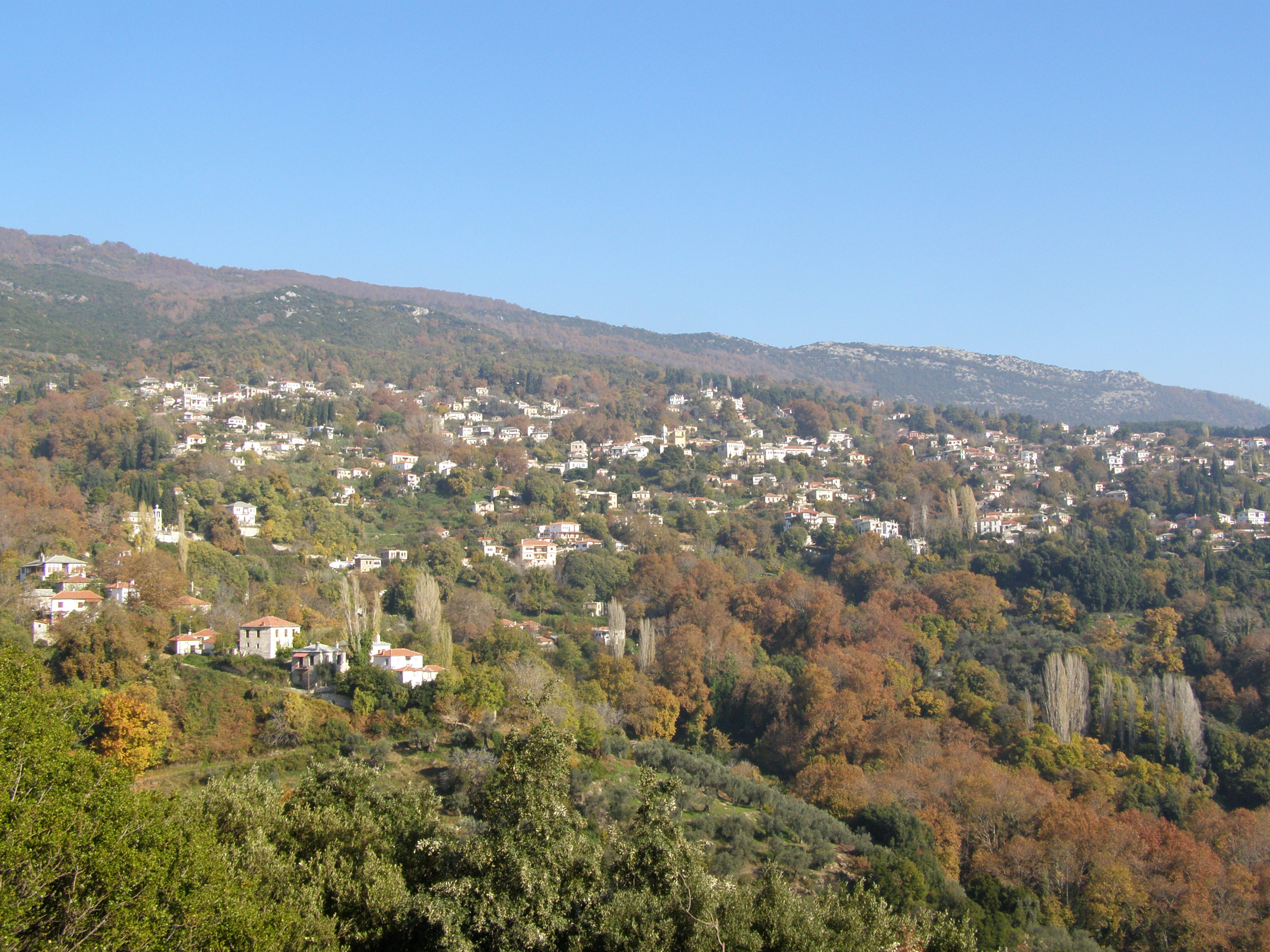
Milies

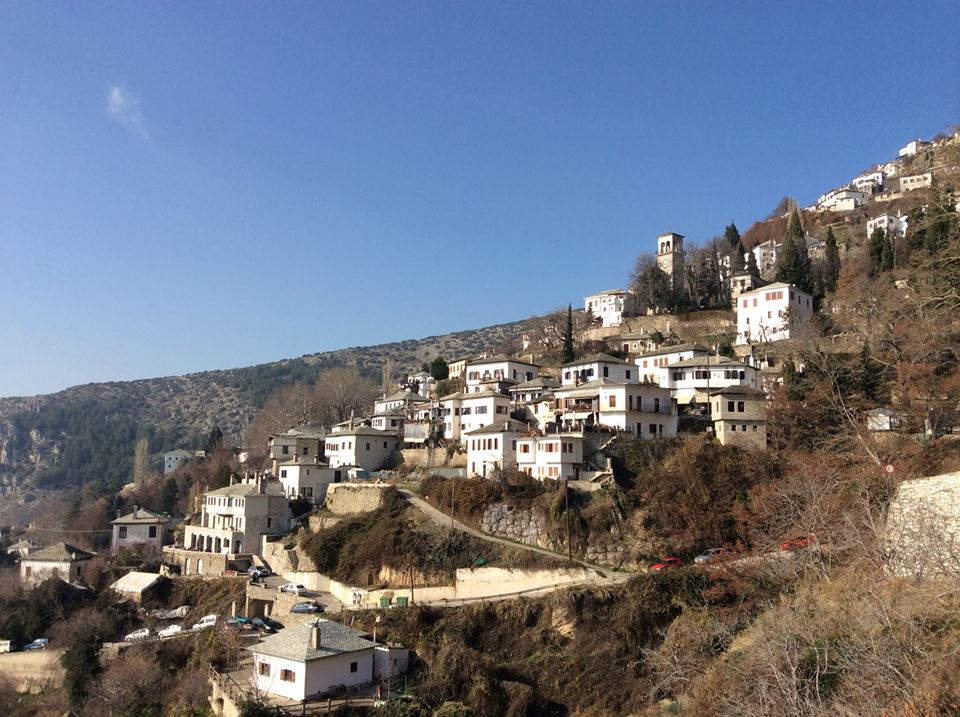
Makrinitsa

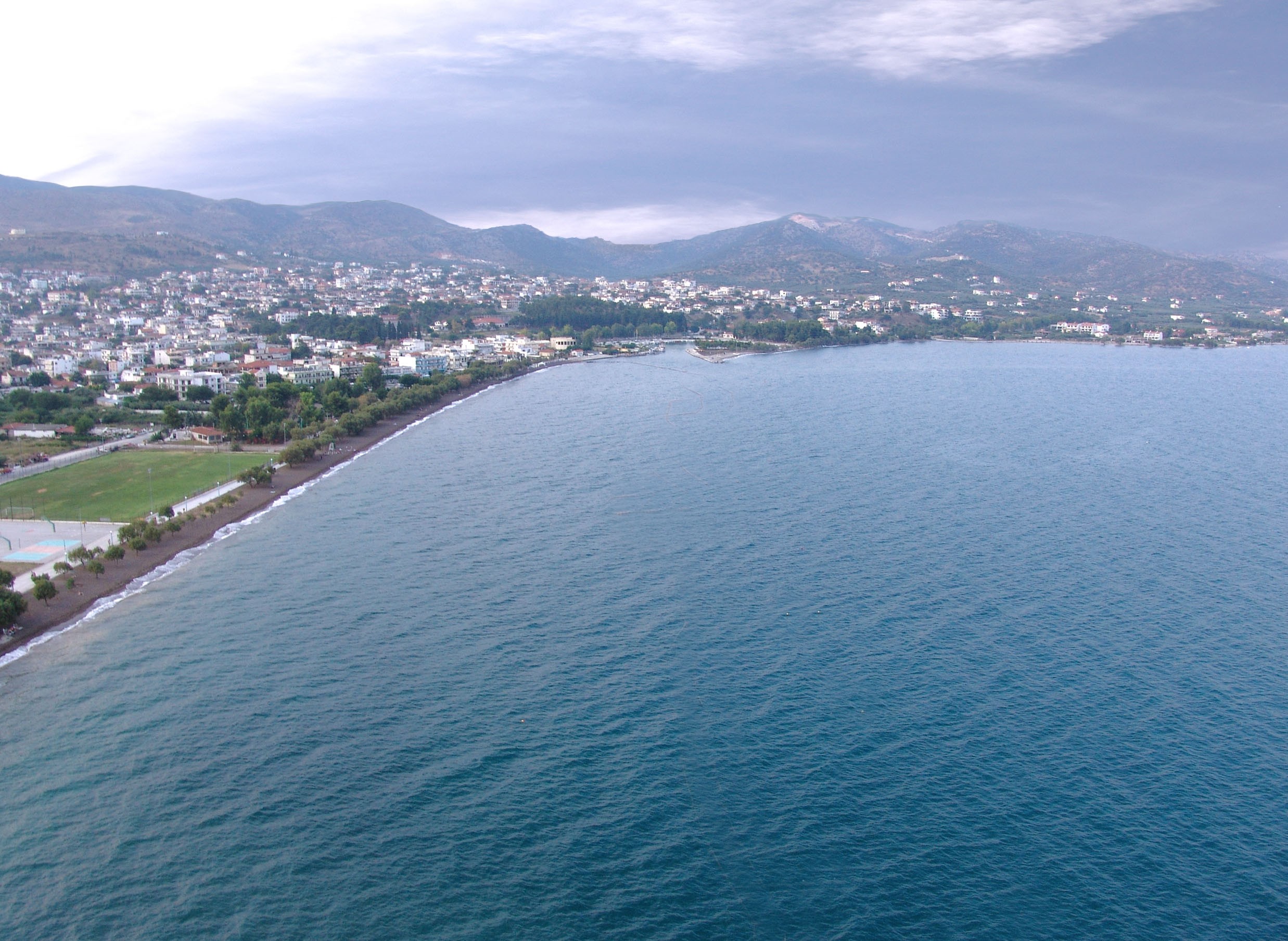
Nea Anchialos

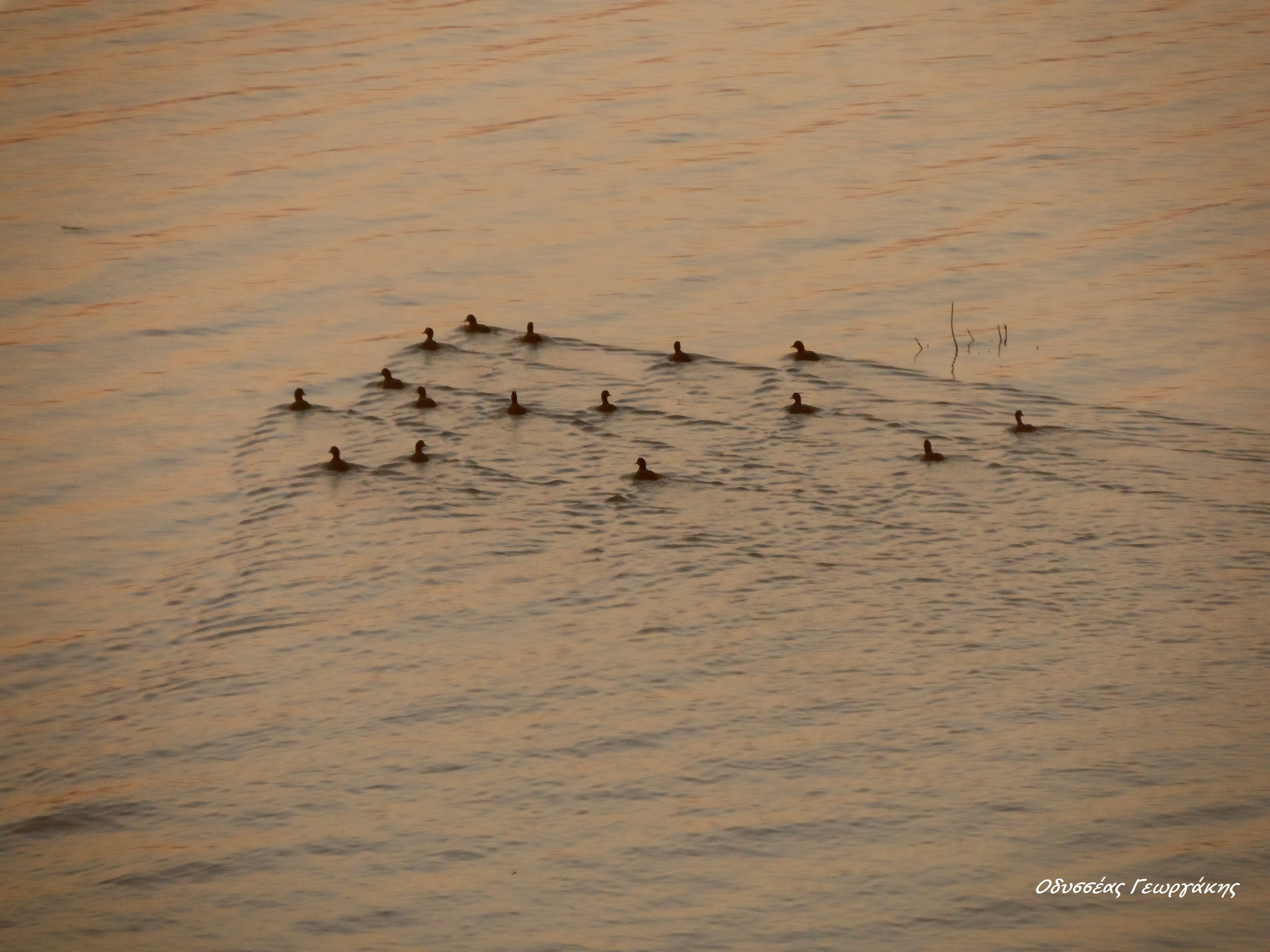
Lake Karla

The regional unit Magnesia is subdivided into five municipalities. These are (number as in the map in the infobox):

- Almyros (2)
- Rigas Feraios (6)
- South Pelion (Notio Pilio, 5)
- Volos (1)
- Zagora-Mouresi (4)

=== Prefecture ===
Magnesia was created as a prefecture. In addition to the territory of the present regional unit of Magnesia, the Magnesia Prefecture included the northern Sporades group of islands (Skiathos, Skopelos and Alonnisos). As a part of the 2011 Kallikratis government reform, the prefecture was split into the Magnesia and Sporades regional units. At the same time, the municipalities were reorganised, according to the table below.

New municipality	Old municipalities	Seat
Almyros	Almyros	Almyros
Almyros	Anavra	Almyros
Almyros	Pteleos	Almyros
Almyros	Sourpi	Almyros
Rigas Feraios	Feres	Velestino
Rigas Feraios	Karla	Velestino
Rigas Feraios	Keramidi	Velestino
South Pelion (Notio Pilio)	Argalasti	Argalasti
South Pelion (Notio Pilio)	Afetes	Argalasti
South Pelion (Notio Pilio)	Milies	Argalasti
South Pelion (Notio Pilio)	Sipiada	Argalasti
South Pelion (Notio Pilio)	Trikeri	Argalasti
Volos	Volos	Volos
Volos	Agria	Volos
Volos	Aisonia	Volos
Volos	Artemida	Volos
Volos	Iolkos	Volos
Volos	Makrinitsa	Volos
Volos	Nea Anchialos	Volos
Volos	Nea Ionia	Volos
Volos	Portaria	Volos
Zagora-Mouresi	Zagora	Zagora
Zagora-Mouresi	Mouresi	Zagora

=== Provinces ===
- Province of Volos – Volos
- Province of Almyros – Almyros
- Province of Skopelos and Sporades – Skopelos

Note: Provinces no longer hold any legal status in Greece.

== History ==
=== Antiquity ===
==== Founding ====
According to Hesiod's (probably) "Eoiae" (Greek: Ηοίαι) or "Catalogue of Women" on the origin of the Greeks, Pandora (named after her grandmother Pandora, sister of Hellen and daughter of Deukalion and Pyrrha) together with Zeus had one son Graecus, while Zeus had two more with Thyia, another of Deukalion's daughter: Magnes and Macedon. Magnes and Makednos together with Hellen's three sons Dorus, Xuthus (with his sons Ion and Achaeus) and Aeolus, comprised the set of progenitors of the ancient tribes that formed the Greek/Hellenic nation. Magnes ruled the area and people under his name. Magnesia is also homeland of the mythical heroes Jason, Peleus and his son Achilles.

The Magnetes contributed to the Greek colonization, with their main colonies being established before the 7th century BC, under the names of Magnesia beside Sipylus in Lydia and Magnesia on the Maeander in Ionia.

==== Nomenclature ====
The word magnet comes from the Greek magnetes lithos (μαγνήτης λίθος), which means 'stone of Magnesia'. The names for the elements magnesium and manganese are also derived from either this region or its colony Magnesia ad Sipylum, which in addition to the magnetic magnetite (an iron ore), produces certain ores of magnesium and manganese that were known to alchemists.

=== Christian era ===
Written accounts and remains from the fifth-century document the appearance of Christianity in Magnesia. The minutes of the 3rd Ecumenical Conference are co-signed by the Bishop of Dimitriada Cleonikos. Five basilicas have been revealed in Nea Anhialos, showing that the area was undergoing a spiritual growth in that era. Magnesias has churches, monasteries and chapels, many of which are architectural masterpieces in the style that is called "Pelioritica".

In the area of Pelion are the monasteries of Saint Gerasimos in Makrinitsa, The Holy Archangels in Agios Georgios Nilias, Osios Lavredios in Agios Lavrendis, Saint John the Baptist in Siki and Saint Spiridon in Promiri. The most famous is the Flamouriou Monastery, built in the 16th century by Osios Simeon, the so-called "barefoot and loin-clothed", located near Veneto.

In the Almyros area and on the mountain of Othris two other monasteries were built, one inhabited by monks in Ano Panagia (Virgin Mary) Xenia and the other by nuns in Kato Panagia Xenia. This monastery holds historical monuments of the area from the 12th century, with of frescoes, treasuries and a library. In Kato Panagia Xenia monastery, an icon of the Virgin Mary, venerated by the people of the area, is kept. All the monasteries are of archeological, historical and artistic interest and are accessible (Flamouriou Monastery only by men).

== Archaeological sites ==
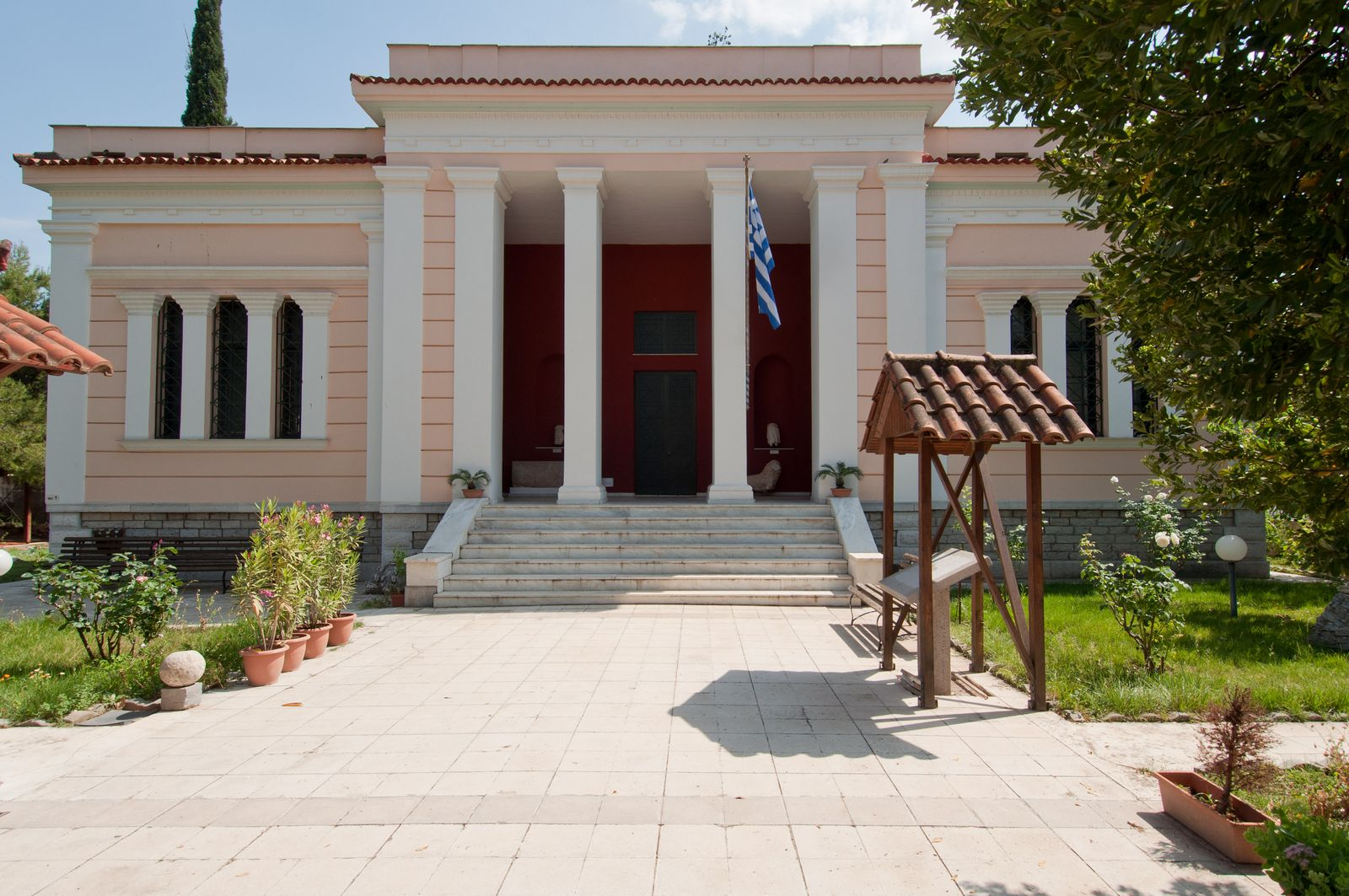
Archaeological museum of Almyros

- Demetrias
- Iolcus
- Mikrothives
- Nea Anchialos
- Pagasae

== Media ==
- TRT TV
- ASTRA TELEVISION

== Transport ==
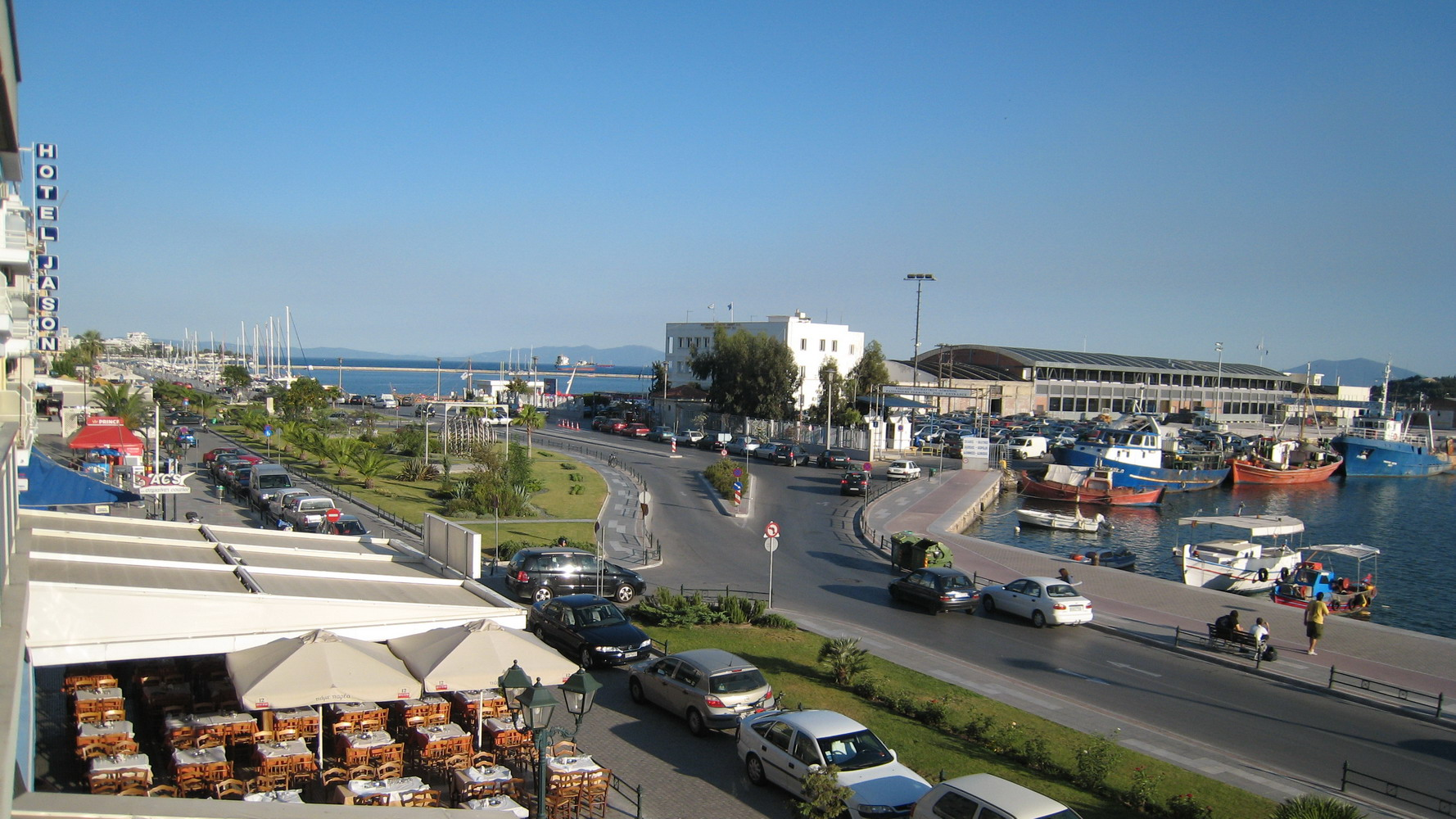
Port of Volos

The Greek rail network reached the former prefecture in 1884, with the opening of the Larissa–Volos railway. Nea Anchialos National Airport, a regional airport near Almyros, started passenger services in February 1991 and includes a terminal that can serve up to 1,500 passengers per hour.

The main roads in Magnesia are the A1 motorway (part of European route E75), as well as the EO1, EO6, EO30, EO34 and EO34a national roads: the EO71 is a military airport road that does not run to the passenger airport terminal.

== Notable residents ==
- Giorgio de Chirico (1888–1978)
- Lavrentis Dianellos, Greek actor
- Rigas Feraios, the first Greek revolutionary and poet, national hero
- Anthimos Gazis (died 1828)
- Phaidon Gizikis (1917–1999), Greek politician
- Theophilos Hatzimihail, artist, (1871–1934)
- Lavrentis Machairitsas, composer, musician
- Alexandros Papadiamantis, (1851–1911)
- Vangelis Papathanassiou, composer, (1943–2022)
- Paraskevi Tsiamita, gold medalist in triple jump, 1999 World Championships in Athletics
- Olga Vasdeki, bronze medalist in triple jump, 1999 World Championships in Athletics
- Sofia Vembo (1910–1978), musician, artist

== See also ==
- List of Greek place names
- List of settlements in the Magnesia regional unit
