= Boebe =

Boebe or Boibe (ancient Greek: Βοίβη) may refer to:

- Boebe (Crete), a town of ancient Crete, Greece
- Boebe (Thessaly), a town of ancient Thessaly, Greece
- Boebeis Lake, a lake of ancient Thessaly, Greece
