= Rigas Feraios (disambiguation) =

Rigas Feraios (Greek: Ρήγας Φεραίος) is the name of a Greek writer, political thinker and revolutionary.

It may also mean:

- Rigas Feraios (municipality), a municipality in Thessaly, Greece.
- Rigas Feraios (youth organization), the youth organization of the former Communist Party of Greece (Interior) (-1987) and of the Renewing Communist Ecological Left (1987–1999)
- A.C. Rigas Feraios Velestino, a football club in Velestino, Greece.
