= Onchestus =

Onchestus may refer to:

- Onchestus or Onchestos, Greek town in ancient Boeotia northwest of Thebes
- Onchestus (river), river of ancient Thessaly, Greece
- Onchestus (phasmid), genus of insect
- Onchestus rentzi, Australian species of stick insect

== See also ==
- Onchestos (mythology)
