= Constantine Maliasenos =

Byzantine Greek nobleman and magnate

Constantine Komnenos Maliasenos Doukas Bryennios (Greek: Κωνσταντῖνος Κομνηνός Μαλιασηνός Δούκας Βρυέννιος) was a Byzantine Greek nobleman and magnate active in Thessaly in the first half of the 13th century.

== Life ==
The family of the Maliasenoi first appears with Constantine, but it is possible that a certain pansebastos sebastos Nicholas Maliases, attested in 1191, was his father or otherwise a relative. Constantine himself is usually called with the surnames "Komnenos Maliasenos", but occasionally the surnames of two other major Byzantine aristocratic houses, Doukas and Bryennios, are added to them. In addition, his epitaph, composed by Manuel Holobolos, claims that his ancestors were scions of members of the Komnenian dynasty "born in the purple", and of a person with the rank of Caesar. According to the modern prosopographer of the Doukas family, Demetrios Polemis, the obvious candidates are Caesar Nikephoros Bryennios the Younger and Anna Komnene, daughter of Emperor Alexios I Komnenos (r. 1081–1118).

In 1215 (earlier dated to 1230) he founded a monastery at Makrinitsa. At the time, the area was under the rule of the Latin Kingdom of Thessalonica. He married Maria, the daughter of Michael I Komnenos Doukas (r. 1205–1214/15), ruler of Epirus, and had at least one son, Nicholas Maliasenos. Another possible son is a monk called Neilos Maliasenos. Michael I appointed his son-in-law governor of the portion of Thessaly that he captured from the Latins in the early 1210s. Maliasenos remained in Thessaly under Michael's successors, but in 1239 he may have supported Manuel Komnenos Doukas, the deposed Emperor of Thessalonica, who landed in Demetrias and tried to wrest back his throne from John Komnenos Doukas and his father Theodore Komnenos Doukas. Eventually, a settlement was reached and Manuel received Thessaly as a personal domain. When Manuel died in 1241, the region was swiftly occupied by Michael II Komnenos Doukas of Epirus (r. 1230–1266/68).

In 1246, Michael II issued a chrysobull that recognized him as founder (ktetor) of another monastery, that of Ilarion at Halmyros, which became a dependency (metochion) of the Makrinitissa Monastery. Maliasenos is attested for the last time in c. 1252, when Michael II sent him on a diplomatic mission to the Nicaean emperor John III Vatatzes. He shortly thereafter became a monk, and died sometime before October 1256. Sometime after his mission to Nicaea, Maliasenos seems to have been estranged with Michael II, who removed the Ilarion Monastery from the jurisdiction of Makrinitissa. At about the same time, his son Nicholas married a relative of the Nicaean nobleman (and future emperor) Michael Palaiologos, possibly indicating a shift in Maliasenos' allegiance away from Epirus to Nicaea.

After his death, the Maliasenos family continued to be among the main regional magnates in northern Thessaly until well into the 14th century.

== Sources ==
- Fine, John V. A. Jr. (1994) [1987]. The Late Medieval Balkans: A Critical Survey from the Late Twelfth Century to the Ottoman Conquest. Ann Arbor, Michigan: University of Michigan Press. ISBN 978-0-472-10079-8.
- Nicol, Donald MacGillivray (2010). The Despotate of Epiros 1267–1479: A Contribution to the History of Greece in the Middle Ages. Cambridge University Press. ISBN 978-0-521-13089-9.
- Polemis, Demetrios I. (1968). The Doukai: A Contribution to Byzantine Prosopography. London: The Athlone Press.
- Trapp, Erich; Beyer, Hans-Veit; Walther, Rainer; Sturm-Schnabl, Katja; Kislinger, Ewald; Leontiadis, Ioannis; Kaplaneres, Sokrates (1976–1996). Prosopographisches Lexikon der Palaiologenzeit (in German). Vienna: Verlag der Österreichischen Akademie der Wissenschaften. ISBN 3-7001-3003-1.
- Van Tricht, Filip (2011). The Latin Renovatio of Byzantium: The Empire of Constantinople (1204–1228). Leiden: Brill. ISBN 978-90-04-20323-5.
- Varzos, Konstantinos (1984). Η Γενεαλογία των Κομνηνών [The Genealogy of the Komnenoi] (PDF) (in Greek). Vol. B. Thessaloniki: Centre for Byzantine Studies, University of Thessaloniki.
