= Nicholas Maliasenos =

Nicholas Komnenos Angelos Doukas Bryennios Maliasenos (Greek: Νικόλαος Κομνηνός Ἄγγελος Δούκας Βρυέννιος Μαλιασηνός) was a Byzantine Greek nobleman and magnate active in the region of Volos in Thessaly the second half of the 13th century.

== Life ==
Nicholas was the son of the first attested member of the Maliasenos family, Constantine, a magnate in Thessaly who married Maria, the daughter of Michael I Komnenos Doukas, ruler of Epirus. Like his father, he is usually called with the surnames "Komnenos Maliasenos", but occasionally the surnames of two other major Byzantine aristocratic houses, Doukas and Bryennios, are added to them. He is also frequently called Angelos, probably inherited via his mother.

From his father, he inherited large estates in Thessaly. Initially under the Epirote rulers, Nicholas was confirmed in his possessions by the Byzantine emperor Michael VIII Palaiologos as well. Nicholas married Anna Komnene Doukaina Palaiologina Philanthropene, a niece of Michael VIII Palaiologos, in ca. 1255. They had at least one son, named John. This marriage, as well as the removal of the Ilarion Monastery at Halmyros from the purview of the Monastery of Makrinitissa, founded by Nicholas' father, by the Despot of Epirus Michael II Komnenos Doukas, seems to indicate a shift in the family's allegiance to the then Empire of Nicaea. It was therefore Michael VIII's brother, John Palaiologos, who restored the monastery's dependency at Halmyros and reconfirmed its tax immunity in 1259, which was reconfirmed in 1266 by Nikephoros I Komnenos Doukas.

Sometime in 1271–72, Nicholas and his wife founded the Nea Petra Monastery at Dryanoubaina in Thessaly. Originally a female convent, sometime between 1274 and 1277 it was converted into a male monastery. Nicholas gave both this and the Makrinitissa Monastery several other estates as dependencies, and even succeeded in receiving from Michael VIII the Latomou Monastery in Thessalonica as a dependency of his family's two foundations. Sometime between 1274 and 1276, the couple too became monks, assuming the monastic names of Joasaph and Anthousa respectively; Nicholas may later have taken a second monastic name, Neilos, on account of an inscription from the Makrinitissa Monastery that was later incorporated in the Church of the Virgin in Makrinitsa. Nicholas was still alive in 1280, and possibly as late as 1285/86. After his death, he was buried at the Makrinitissa Monastery. After the latter's destruction, his gravestone, containing a poem, was incorporated in the masonry of the Athanasios Monastery at Makrinitsa.

== Sources ==
- Bartusis, Mark C. (2012). Land and Privilege in Byzantium: The Institution of Pronoia. Cambridge University Press. ISBN 978-1-107-00962-2.
- Polemis, Demetrios I. (1968). The Doukai: A Contribution to Byzantine Prosopography. London: The Athlone Press.
- Trapp, Erich; Beyer, Hans-Veit (2001). Prosopographisches Lexikon der Palaiologenzeit (in German). Vol. I, 1–12, Add. 1–2, CD-ROM Version. Vienna: Verlag der Österreichischen Akademie der Wissenschaften. ISBN 978-3-7001-3003-1.
