= Stefanovikeio =

Stefanovikeio Στεφανοβίκειο
- Community
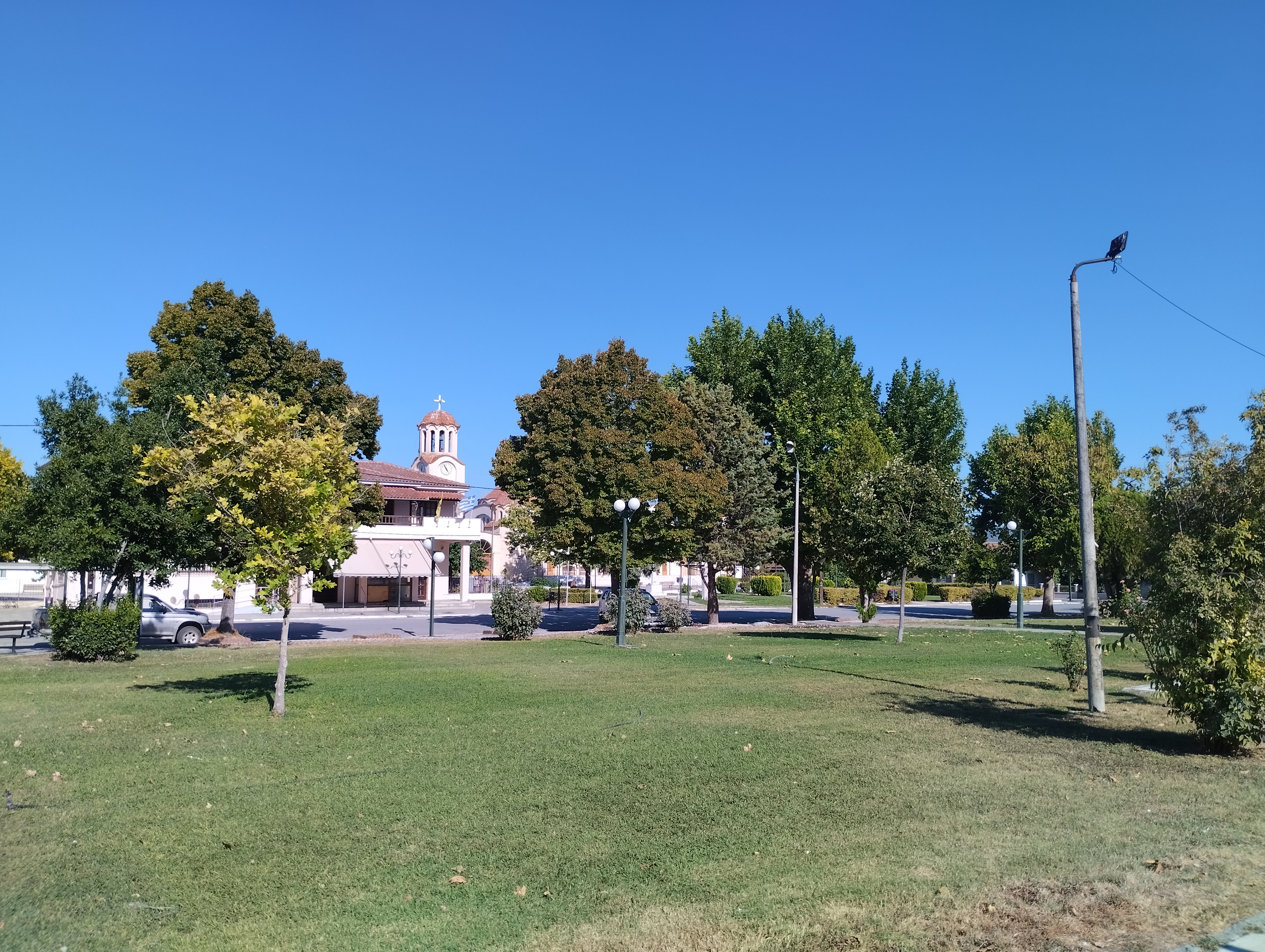

- Location within Greece
- Coordinates: 39°27′46.8″N 22°44′27.6″E
- Country: Greece
- Administrative region: Thessaly
- Regional unit: Magnesia
- Municipality: Rigas Feraios
- Municipal unit: Karla
- Elevation: 47 m (154 ft)

Population (2021)
  - Community: 1,468
- Time zone: UTC+2 (EET)
  - Summer (DST): UTC+3 (EEST)
- Postal code: 37500

Stefanovikeio (Greek: Στεφανοβίκειο) is a small town in Thessaly, Greece. It is part of the Rigas Feraios municipality, and the municipal unit Karla.

== Location ==
Stefanovikeio is located in the regional unit of Magnesia, in the Rigas Feraios municipality. Before the implementation of the Kallikratis plan, it was part of the municipality of Karla, which became a municipal unit. The town is served by a railway station on the Larissa-Volos branch line.

== The name ==
In 1809, William Martin Leake visited Stefanovikeio and wrote that the "Chatzimes is a chiflik with 50 Greek houses." In all likelihood, "Chatzimes" was the name of the village's Ottoman owner. The headquarters of the Turkish lord of Stefanovikeio, the 'Konaki' (Greek: Κονάκι), is the only building that survived the earthquake of 1957.

A few years later, in 1815, the name had been changed to Chatzimissi ("Half-a-Hadji")," as Arg. Filippides writes in his book "Geographia Meriki". This name, (Greek: Χατζήμισι), could possibly originate in the fact that the Turkish owner of the area did not manage to complete the Hajj to Mecca and assume the title of Hajji.

Shortly before the area was taken from the Ottomans and returned to Greece in 1881, the village and the surrounding area were purchases by the Paul Stefanovic Skylitsis. His mother, Eleni Machaira, is said to have encouraged him to give the land away to benefit Greece, and, as reported by the residents, he did donate the land to the Greek state, prompting the people to name the village after him.

== History ==
After the liberation in 1881, owner of the village became a Yugoslav origin, named Paul Stefanovik Skylitsis who - as said - won 11,000 acres by Lake Karla, from the Turkish owner at a card game in Istanbul. Stefanovik acquired his remaining property in Thessaly, by lending money to local beys. However Stefanovik's mother was Greek, and persuaded him to donate the estate to the locals. Stefanovik indeed – as reported by the residents – donated the area to the Greek State, and in recognition of this, the inhabitants named the village after him.

After the reparcelling, however, those receiving farms paid to the State the value of land granted. Indeed, in most cases, they paid twice as the government collector who visited the village, usually avoided giving receipts for payments received. Eventually the locals became long-term indebted and financially illiquid. Therefore, if collectors appeared, many fled hiding in the swamps of Karla, reemerging only after the collector and his warden custody departed.

Stefanovik, apart from the Stefanovikeio estate, owned some 31 other estates, 26 of which in Thessaly. Apart from livestock ranges, his property in Thessaly comprised more than 66,000 acres of arable land. All and all in his properties – collectively known as Stefanovik lands – 600 families were established.

After his death, the estates passed to his London-resident nephew, of the same name. This is stated in the book "The kolligoi (sharecroppers) of Thessaly" by Sophocles Triantafyllides.

Later on, in the year 1901, his nephew and heir, sold in turn these Thessalian properties at a low price to the Greek Government, for the purpose to distribute these amongst the local farmers.

More specifically, on September 5 of 1901, the will of Stefanovik was made public in Istanbul. By this will – as mentioned in the newspaper "Volos'Thessaly" – amongst other large donations to the Nation, Paul Stefanovik Skylitsis, donated to Greece his Thessalian estates amounting to 22 villages, whose value is estimated to 10,000,000 drachmas of the era, under the condition that the resulted state revenues are given tho the Ecumenical Patriarchate and used to finance Greek Orthodox Church clerics still functioning under foreign yoke.

On 07.12.1901, the Stefanovik estates sale contract was signed for the nominal amount of 80,000 pounds, a price considered as "token sum". The sum was raised via loan approved by the National Bank. On 14.02.1902 began in Larissa the acceptance of the estates by an Ecumenical Surveyor and 05/23/1902, the government decided to rent them, until they become counted and classified by land quality to allow for distribution. Finally on 09.29.1902, was auction for temporary rent in private estate of Stefanovikeiou and Rizomylos (Greek: Ριζόμυλος).

In 1904, someone by the name of Salih Bey, raised a lawsuit against the London-resident Ioannis Stefanovik, brother of Pavlos Stefanovik, claimed ownership of some estates, then already purchased by the Greek government. Salih Bey claimed he owned land titles for estates he mortgaged to the late Stefanovik; and that he was willing to pay the borrowed amount plus interest, in order to get them back. The case was heard before the Commercial Court of Istanbul on 07.03.1904 without an immediate decision. Finally the Salih case was dropped. However, the submission of the claim caused great alarm to farmers, as appears in Volos newspapers reports of the time. During Turkish rule, the village had been seat of the Bey of Karla region. Furthermore, about 4 km. from the last houses of the village to the side of Karla, traces can be found of older settlements at the sites "Magoula" and "Petra".
