= Karla, Greece =

Karla Κάρλα
- Municipal unit
- Location within the regional unit

- Location within Greece
- Coordinates: 39°28′N 22°45′E
- Country: Greece
- Administrative region: Thessaly
- Regional unit: Magnesia
- Municipality: Rigas Feraios

Area
  - Municipal unit: 223.6 km^{2} (86.3 sq mi)
- Elevation: 60 m (200 ft)

Population (2021)
  - Municipal unit: 3,766
  - Municipal unit density: 16.84/km^{2} (43.62/sq mi)
- Time zone: UTC+2 (EET)
  - Summer (DST): UTC+3 (EEST)
- Postal code: 38x xx
- Area code: 24280
- Vehicle registration: ΒΟ
- Website: www.dimoskarlas.gr

Karla (Greek: Κάρλα) is a former municipality in Magnesia, Thessaly, Greece. Since the 2011 local government reform it is part of the municipality Rigas Feraios, of which it is a municipal unit. The municipal unit has an area of 223.591 km^{2}. The population of the municipal unit is 3,766 (2021). It is an agricultural area producing cereals, cotton and vegetables (28 kilometres away from Volos). The capital of the municipality was Stefanovikeio. The municipality was named after Lake Karla although in the antiquity was known as Voivis. This shows that it was dedicated to the sun and the goddess Phoebe who was Leto's mother, and grandmother to Phoebus Apollo and Artemis.

In the Middle Ages the name changed to Karla after the Lake Karla. The draining of the lake begun in 1956 and was completed in 1962. The lake was just outside Kanalia, where according to Greek mythology, Apollo fell in love with Coronis. Asclepius, the first famous Greek doctor, was the outcome of this relationship.

The old town of Karla which led its name to the lake, was in fact where the modern village of Kanalia is today. Today Lake Karla is in the process of being reconstructed and in a few years, the area is expected to be developed, as an area of interest for tourists.

The village of Kanalia is located 26 kilometres from Volos and at a height of 80 metres above the sea level. It is one of the prettiest on the north-west side of Pelion. It is built on the foundation of the Acropolis Voivis in the plains of Metochi. On the hill above the village one can see the remains of the walls of ancient Voivis as well as the ruins of three forts that protected the road. Kanalia, Kapourna and Kerasia make up the first municipality of Voivis in Volos. The church of Saint Nicolas (11th century), can be found in the area. Visitors to the area enjoy the plethora of almond trees when they are in blossom, they can even attend the celebration of the blossoming almond trees. Rizomylos is considered to be a village that has suffered a lot as many of the inhabitants were killed during World War II and the German occupation. Carnival celebrations take place in the villages of Rizomylos and Stefanovikeio.

Ano and Kato Kerasia are well known for their stone arched backed bridges as well as their customs.
