= Charmaina =

Coordinates: 39°43′N 22°38′E

Charmaina (Greek: Χάρμαινα) was a medieval settlement and Eastern Orthodox bishopric.

Its exact location is unknown, but Charmaina lay on the western slopes of Mount Ossa, near modern Marmarini, Greece. The name is of Slavic origin, and first attested in the 11th century, when it was a bishopric. It is attested as an active see through the Notitiae Episcopatuum of the Patriarchate of Constantinople until the 15th century.

The settlement featured a monastery dedicated to the Panagia, which in 1277 became property of the Makrinitissa Monastery.
