= Kanalia =

Kanalia Κανάλια
- Community
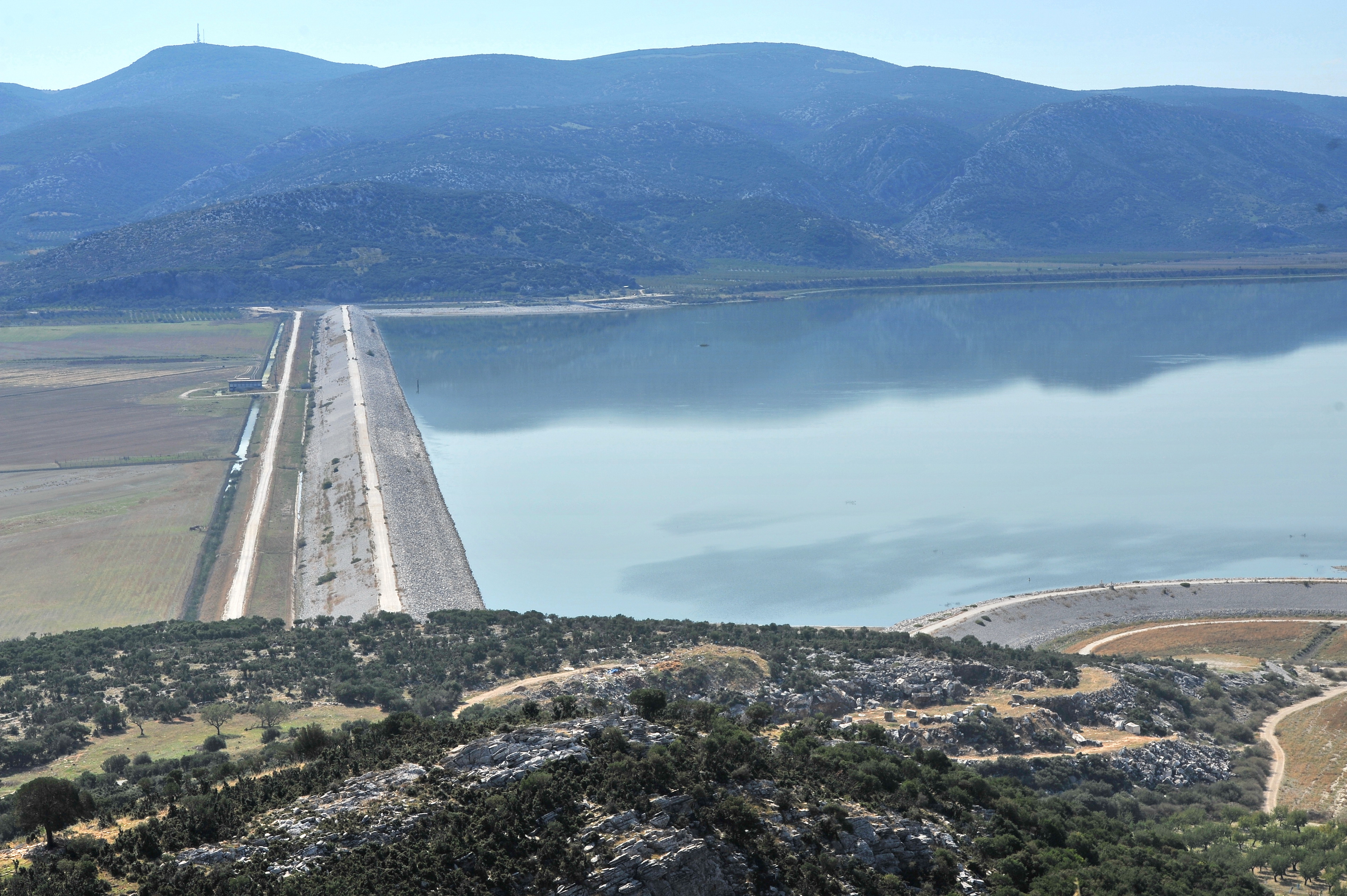
- Lake Karla

- Location within Greece
- Coordinates: 39°29′N 22°52′E
- Country: Greece
- Administrative region: Thessaly
- Regional unit: Magnesia
- Municipality: Rigas Feraios
- Municipal unit: Karla
- Elevation: 80 m (260 ft)

Population (2021)
  - Community: 893
- Time zone: UTC+2 (EET)
  - Summer (DST): UTC+3 (EEST)
- Postal code: 38 500
- Area code: 24210

Kanalia (Greek: Κανάλια) is a village and community in Thessaly, Greece, part of the municipality Rigas Feraios. It is located 26 kilometres (16 mi) from Volos and at a height of 80 metres (260 ft) above the sea level. It is one of the prettiest on the north-west side of Pelion. It is built on the foundation of the Acropolis of Boebe (Greek: Βοίβη Voivi) in the plains of Metochi. On the hill above the village one can see the remains of the walls of ancient Boebe, as well as the ruins of three forts that protected the road. Between 1883 and 1912, Kanalia was the seat of the municipality Voivi, which also included the villages Kapourna and Kerasia. The church of Saint Nicolas (11th century), can be found in the area. Visitors to the area enjoy the plethora of almond trees when they are in blossom, they can even attend the celebration of the Blossoming Almond trees.

There is a lake in the area named Lake Karla, which was drained between 1960 and 2000. Since 2001 the Greek Government has attempted to reconstruct the lake to its previous size, through the financial aid of European Union and Natura 2000.
