= Feres, Magnesia =

Feres Φερές
- Municipal unit
- Location within the regional unit

- Location within Greece
- Coordinates: 39°22′N 22°44′E
- Country: Greece
- Administrative region: Thessaly
- Regional unit: Magnesia
- Municipality: Rigas Feraios

Area
  - Municipal unit: 215.5 km^{2} (83.2 sq mi)
- Elevation: 120 m (390 ft)

Population (2021)
  - Municipal unit: 4,746
  - Municipal unit density: 22.02/km^{2} (57.04/sq mi)
- Time zone: UTC+2 (EET)
  - Summer (DST): UTC+3 (EEST)
- Postal code: 37 500
- Area code: 24250
- Vehicle registration: ΒΟ

Feres (Greek: Φερές; Katharevousa: Φεραί) is a former municipality in Magnesia, Thessaly, Greece. Since the 2011 local government reform it is part of the municipality Rigas Feraios, of which it is a municipal unit. The municipal unit has an area of 215.513 km^{2}. Population 4,746 (2021). The seat of the municipality was in the town Velestino.

Feres is located near the ancient city of Pherae, after which it was named.

== Notable people ==
- Rigas Feraios (1757–1798), Greek Enlightenment writer and revolutionary
