= Makrinitissa Monastery =

Former monastery in Thessaly, Greece

- Μονή Μακρινιντίσσης
- Location of the former monastery in Greece
- Makrinitissa Monastery
- 39°24′10″N 22°59′24″E
- Location: Makrinitsa, Volos, Thessaly
- Country: Greece
- Denomination: Greek Orthodox (former)

History
- Status: Monastery and katholikon
- Founder: Constantine Maliasenos

Architecture
- Functional status: Inactive (ruinous state)
- Architectural type: Monastery
- Style: Byzantine
- Completed: c. 1205 – c. 1209

The Makrinitissa Monastery (Greek: Μονή Μακρινιντίσσης) was a Greek Orthodox male monastery at Makrinitsa, near Volos, Thessaly, in central Greece. Built in c. 1205 – c. 1209, the monastery and associated katholikon suffered significant damage due to landslides in the early part of the 18th century. Whilst parts of the structure were later rebuilt, the monastery ceased to function.

== History ==
The monastery was founded by the Thessalian magnate Constantine Maliasenos from Demetrias some time before 1215 on Mount Drongos in the district of Dryanoubaina, and dedicated to the Theotokos "of the Swift Visitation" (τῆς Ὀξείας Ὲπισκέψεως). As the monastery is recorded as possessing the metochion of Hilarion at Halmyros granted by a certain "Conte", identified by some scholars with William of Champlitte, Prince of Achaea between 1205–1209, the monastery's foundation is usually placed during this time frame. "Conte" may however also be identified with Count Berthold II von Katzenelnbogen, lord of Velestino.

The monastery is first attested in a document issued by Arsenios, the Bishop of Demetrias, in 1215, confirming its status as stauropegic (directly subject to the Patriarchate of Constantinople). Nevertheless, a subsequent charters make clear, Arsenios' successors did not cease to attempt to subordinate the monastery to their see, forcing successive patriarchs to issue statements in defence of the monastery's status: Germanos II between 1233–1240, Manuel II between 1243–1254, and finally Arsenios Autoreianos in 1256, following a petition of Nicholas Maliasenos, son of the monastery's founder.

Both Constantine Maliasenos and his son became monks, with the monastic name of Konstantios and Joasaph respectively, at the monastery in later life, and died and were buried there. According to a document issued by Emperor Michael VIII Palaiologos in 1274, the monastery, along with the nearby female convent of Nea Petra (founded by Nicholas and his wife Anna, a niece of Michael VIII, in 1271/72) at Portaria, were to pass to Nicholas' son John Maliasenos Palaiologos after his parents' death. John apparently engaged in large-scale reconstruction at the monastery, where he too lived out his life as the monk Neilos, since in his funeral inscription he is mentioned as the monastery's "second founder".

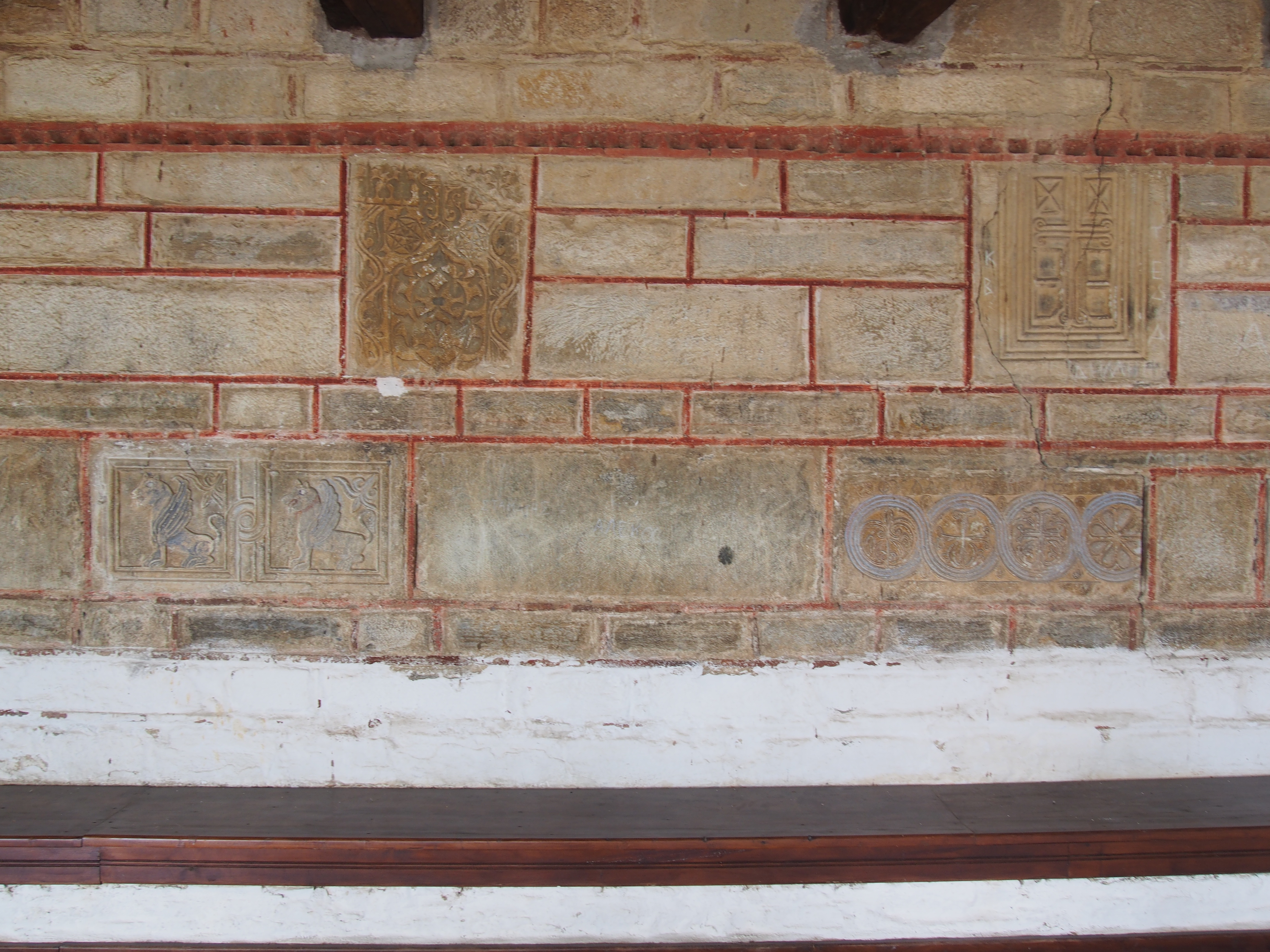
Spolia incorporated into the current Church of the Dormition in Makrinitsa

Following its heyday in the 13th century, the historical sources are completely silent about the monastery during the 14th–17th centuries. Sometime after 1700, the monastery, possibly including the main church (katholikon) suffered considerable damage due to landslides. In 1743, the two-storey chapel of St. Nicholas and All Saints southwest of the katholikon was rebuilt.

The masonry of the ruined katholikon, and part of its decoration—notably a relief of the Theotokos Oxeia Episkepsis—were reused in the Church of the Dormition of the Theotokos which was erected in 1767 in its place. Fragments of the tombs of the Maliasenoi are spread across other churches in the region.

== Possessions ==
The monastery gathered considerable possessions, which had to be repeatedly confirmed in a series of deeds. Thus the monastery of Hilarion at Halmyros was granted to the monastery as a metochion, but later removed by the Latin rulers of Thessaly, before being restored to the Makrinitissa Monastery by Michael II of Epirus. It was reconfirmed as a possession of Makrinitissa by Arsenios Autoreianos, although he also recognized the canonical rights of the Bishop of Velestino over it. However, it appears that the Maliasenoi fell out with the rulers of Epirus, as the Hilarion monastery was removed again from the possession of Makrinitissa, and was only restored to it by Michael VIII's brother John Palaiologos when he captured Thessaly from Epirus in 1260.

== See also ==
- Church of Greece
- List of monasteries in Greece
