= Boebeis Lake =

Lake of Magnesia in ancient Thessaly

Coordinates: 39°32′N 22°45′E

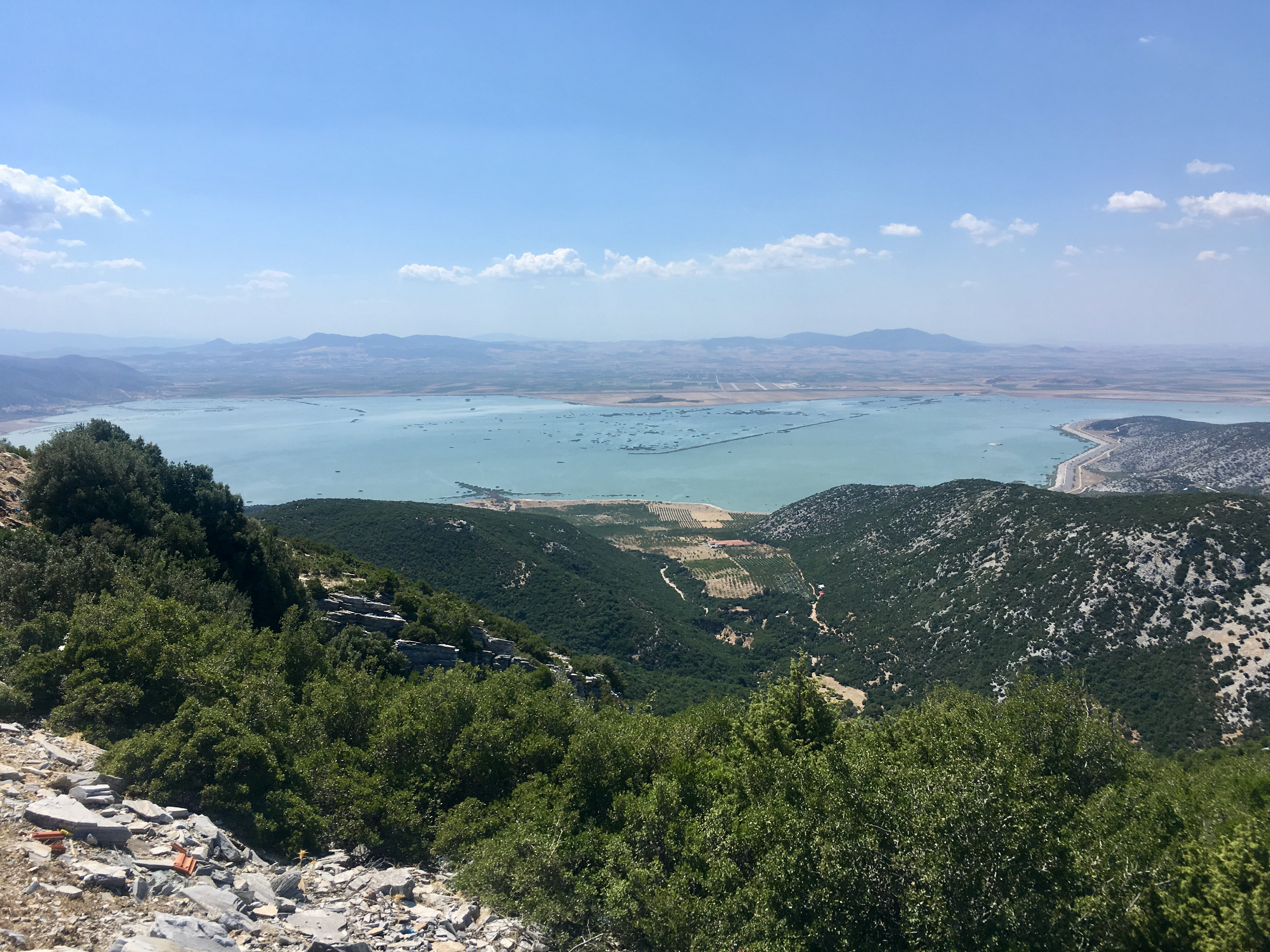
Modern lake Karla, the re-established Lake Boebeis, as seen from the hills above Kanalia.

Boebeis Lake (Βοιβηΐς λίμνη, Βοιβία λίμνη, and Βοιβιάς λίμνη) was a lake of Magnesia in ancient Thessaly, mentioned by Homer, and named for the town (Boebe) on its southeastern shore.

The lake is frequently mentioned by the ancient writers. It received the rivers Onchestus, Amyrus, and several smaller streams, but had no outlet for its waters. From its proximity to Mount Ossa, it is called Ossaea Boebeis by Lucan. Athena is said to have bathed her feet in its waters, which is perhaps the reason why Propertius speaks of sanctae Boebeidos undae. The lake was a long narrow piece of water, and is now called Lake Karla from a village which has disappeared.
