= Casthanaea =

Former town in ancient Greece

Coordinates: 39°35′11″N 22°55′30″E

Map showing ancient Thessaly. Casthanaea is shown on the coast of Magnesia.

Casthanaea or Casthanea or Kasthanaia or Kasthaneia (Greek: Κασθαναία) or Castanea or Kastanaia (Κασταναία) was a town and polis (city-state) of Ancient Magnesia, at the foot of Mount Pelium, with a temple of Aphrodite Casthanitis. It is mentioned by Herodotus in his account of the terrible storm which the fleet of Xerxes I experienced off this part of the coast. and by Pliny. It was from this town that the chestnut tree, which still abounds on the eastern side of Mt. Pelium, derived its name in Greek and the modern languages of Europe. Its location is below the modern village of Keramidi.
