= Lake Karla =

Lake in Thessaly, Greece

- Λίμνη Κάρλα (Greek)
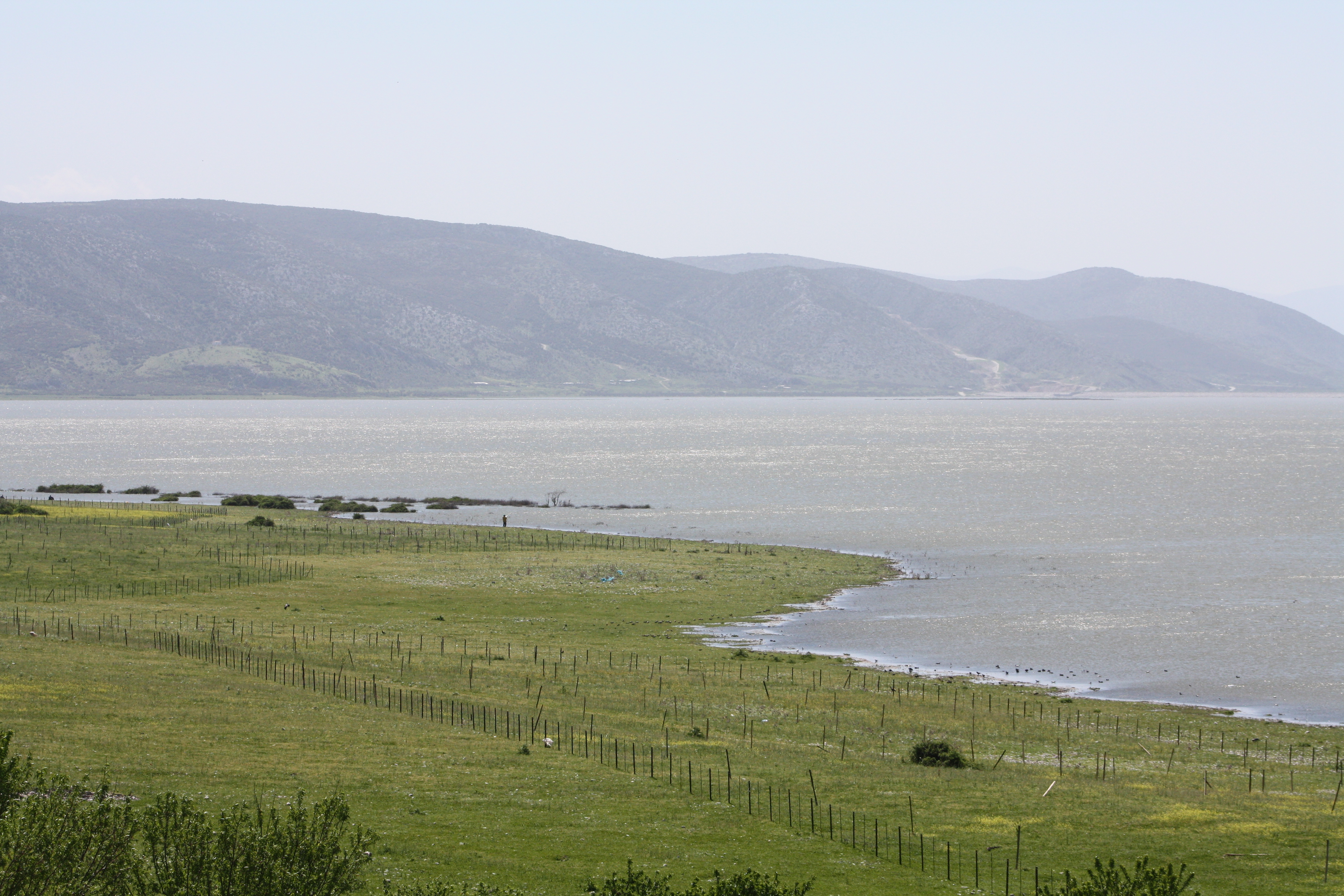
- Lake Karla after its recreation in 2010

- Location within Greece
- Location: Thessaly, Greece
- Coordinates: 39°32′N 22°42′E
- Lake type: Drained (1962), Recreated (2010)
- Primary inflows: 1 river and 7 tributaries
- Primary outflows: Pinios River, evaporation
- Catchment area: 37,000 km^{2} (14,000 sq mi)
- Basin countries: Greece
- Max. length: 25 km (16 mi)
- Max. width: 46 km (29 mi)
- Surface area: 37 km^{2} (14 sq mi)
- Average depth: 6 m (20 ft)
- Max. depth: 20 m (66 ft)
- Shore length^{1}: 25 km (16 mi)
- Surface elevation: 60–80 m (200–260 ft)
- Islands: 3+ islands See article
- Settlements: Kanalia
- ^{1} Shore length is not a well-defined measure.

Lake Karla (Greek: Λίμνη Κάρλα) is a lake that sits at 60 to 80 m (200 to 260 ft) above sea level, making it the only one in the plain of Thessaly. The lake is located at the northern end of the Magnesia regional unit in the Pineios basin, adjacent to Pelion and the Maurovouni mountains. On the eastern part of the lake lies the town of Kanalia.

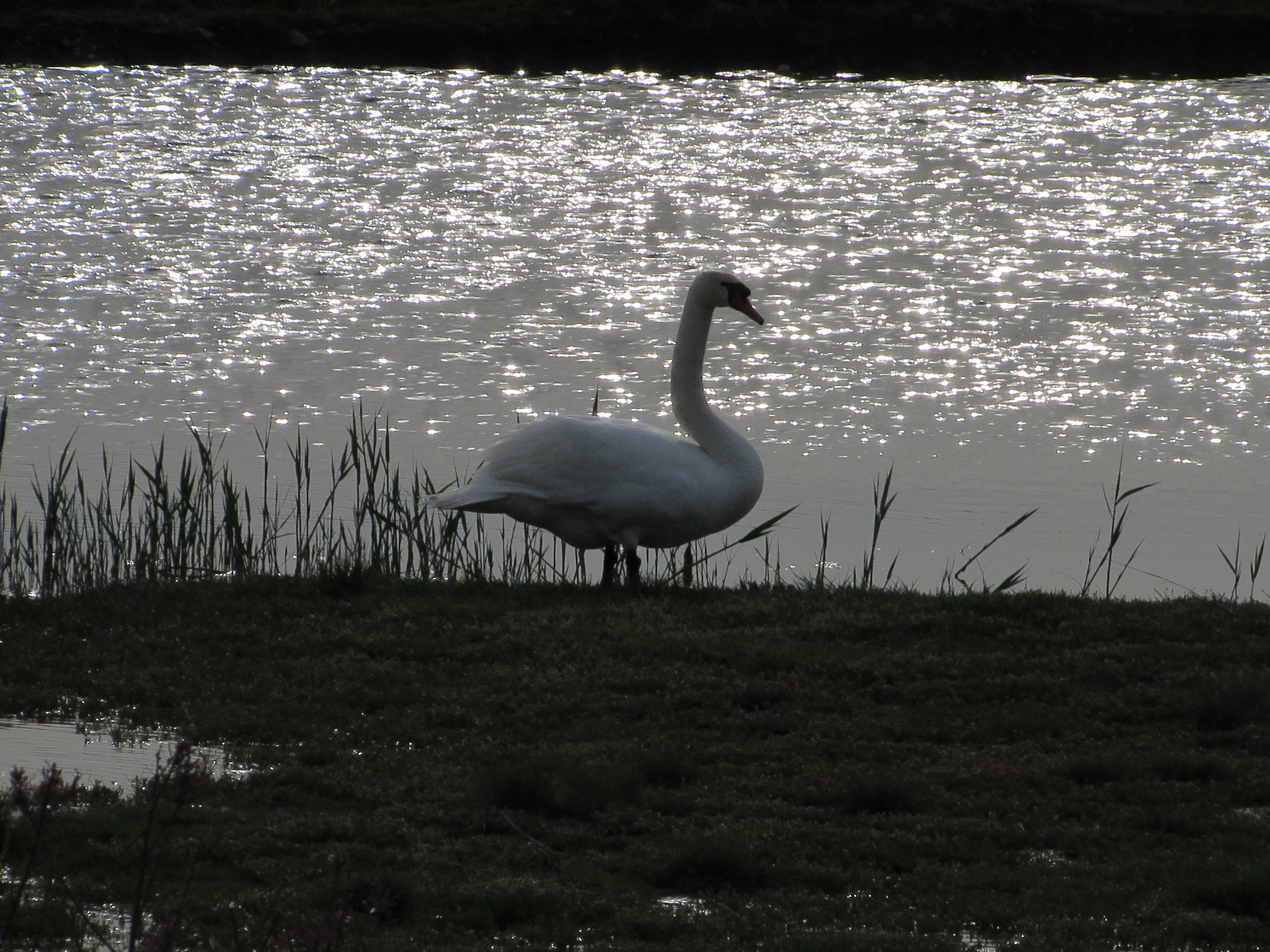
Swan on the lake

== Name ==
Its first name was Boibeis (Ancient Greek: Βοιβηΐς, modern transliteration Voivis) and was taken from the nearby ancient city of Boibe which today is located at Kanalia.

== Restoration of the lake ==
Lake Karla, some 300 km (190 mi) north of Athens, was a 180 km^{2} lake that was completely drained in 1962 to gain land for agriculture. The lake was part of ancient Greek mythology (the god Apollo was married on its shores). Before its drainage, it was the site of a unique fishing culture, with the fishermen spending some nine months of the year in reed huts that they built on the lake. The lake fisheries were an important tradition and to some extent a significant economic activity.

For these reasons, and because agriculture was never successful in the saline soils of the former lake bed, the local population supported a project to restore the lake. The restoration was intended to reflood only 50 of the original 180 km^{2} of the former lake. Initially, the project represented a 100 million ECU investment that was financed with the support of the European Commission. Some technical aspects still required further elaboration in order to ensure that it was environmentally sound, but the project had so much popular and political support that it went ahead. It represents one of the most ambitious wetland restoration projects and a case study for the Ramsar Convention.

The lake was "inaugurated" in October 2018 and now contains even more water than planned. This project is unique to the Balkans and Europe and has been nominated for the EU-Council Prize.

== Other notable facts ==
After draining, the site included Mavrovouni Mountain, two water reservoirs in former Lake Karla and the spring Kefalovryso in Velestino. Mavrovouni (390 km^{2} or 96,000 acres, max elevation 1,054 m or 3,458 ft) extends between the Ossa and Pelion mountains and was restored totally in Magnesia. It mainly consists of schist, and to a lesser extent limestone. The marine area covered 2% of the site, the terrestrial area covered 96% and the reservoirs covered 2%.

Its northeast side ends in steep cliffs on the Aegean Sea. At higher altitudes, it is mainly covered by oak forests (especially Quercus conferta) and at lower parts by beech and chestnut forests. Maquis covers the lower zone. At the eastern part of the mountain it is very dense and dominated by holm oak (Quercus ilex). The rest of the maquis is dominated by kermes oak and wild olive and has deteriorated as a result of intense grazing. This area is used for pasture by high numbers of farm animals. Mavrovouni also includes ravines, rock formations, grasslands, phrygana and agricultural land. A significant number of streams run down the mountain, most of them drying in summer. At the banks of the streams there are plane trees, alders, poplars and willows.

Two water reservoirs, one near Stefanovikio (4 km^{2} or 990 acres) and the other near Kalamaki (2 km^{2} or 490 acres), were constructed in 1988 for irrigating the former lake bed. Their water flowed in from the river Pineios through the Asmaki stream. However, industrial and agricultural wastes flowed into the reservoirs. They were eutrophic, and a rapid increase of reedbeds in them was observed. Kefalovryso spring has suffered the effects of human activities. Its area has been reduced, it has lost its natural vegetation and possibly its native fishes. Now it is used as a pond for the production of commercial (trout) and exotic fishes.

== Notes ==
- The habitat type 5420 concerns mainly Cistus salviifolius, Cistus creticus, Cistus monspeliensis, Thymus capitatus, Ballota acetabulosa, Sarcopoterium spinosum and Genista acanthoclada.
- The reedbeds (Phragmites australis), occurring in the two reservoirs and not included in Annex I, could constitute an additional habitat type.

== See also ==
- Coordination of Information on the Environment
