= Museum of Folk Art and History of Pelion =

- Μουσείο Λαϊκής Τέχνης και Ιστορίας του Πηλίου
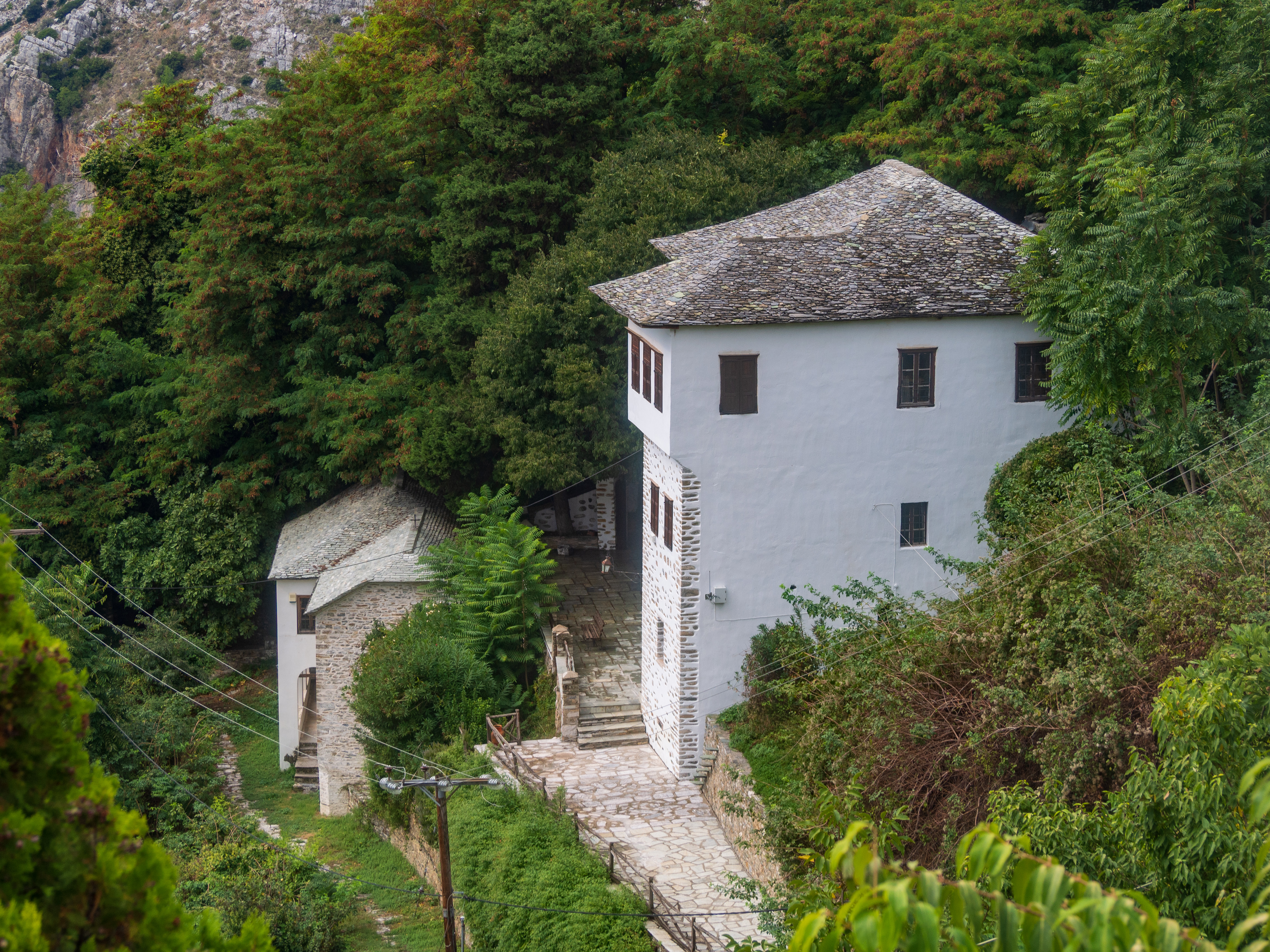
- The museum is housed in Topalis Mansion

- Location within Greece
- Established: 1932
- Location: Makrinitsa, Volos, Magnesia, Greece
- Coordinates: 39.401649°N 22.987008°E
- Type: Folk art museum

The Museum of Folk Art and History of Pelion (Greek: Μουσείο Λαϊκής Τέχνης και Ιστορίας του Πηλίου) is a museum in the village of Makrinitsa (Volos), Magnesia, Greece. It is housed in the Topali Mansion (Greek: Αρχοντικό Τοπάλη), an 1844 building designated a "Work of Art and Historical Preserved Monument". The museum holds a large collection of folk art and everyday objects of the Pelion area from the 18th and 19th centuries;

== Building ==
The museum is housed in the Topali Mansion located just below the main square, beside the Metamorfosi church. It an example of the fortified three-story stone buildings of the period. The mansion is strongly fortified, with many battlements and a defensive turret on the roof. It has a few small barred windows on the ground floor, with slightly more and larger windows on the floors above. The layout is that of the upper case Greek letter gamma: Γ. The wooden roof is covered in local slate. The ground floor held storage rooms, while the family lived on the first floor in winter and on the second floor in summer. The doors are small, wooden and reinforced with iron bars. Well-preserved decorative elements include false windows above the first floor windows, wooden ceilings and the turret with loopholes.

== History ==
The mansion was built in 1844. (Note: The date of 1844 is engraved in a stone relief above the entrance.) It was donated to the community of Makrinitsa in 1932 by the Topali family. The first repairs were made in 1957, and the museum was operational for the ten years of the 1960s. The building was partially repaired and reinforced in 1977. In 1985 it was designated a "Work of Art and Historical Preserved Monument". The building was extensively restored between 1988 and 1994. The present museum has been operating since 1994.

== Collection ==
The museum tries to convey the atmosphere of an old mansion, while also presenting representative objects of the region. There are over 1,500 objects in the collection including frescoes, folk paintings and other folk art of the Pelion area from the 18th and 19th centuries, religious pictures and engravings, traditional costumes, historical relics such as a banner from the 1878 revolution, many photographs from the early 20th century, houseware in bronze, wood and ceramics, equipment for distilling Rakı, and for spinning and weaving. The collection also includes books, jewelry and old weapons. There is a collection of seascapes by the local folk artist N. Christopoulos.

Temporary exhibitions are organized throughout the year, recently in cooperation with the educational programs of the Makrinitas Environmental Education Center. In August 1997 the museum gave an exhibition of paintings by Dimitris Hordaki as part of the "Makrinitsa '97" event. As of 2016 the museum was open from 9:00 to 14:00 Tuesday to Saturday, and from 11:00 to 14:30 on Sunday.

== Gallery ==
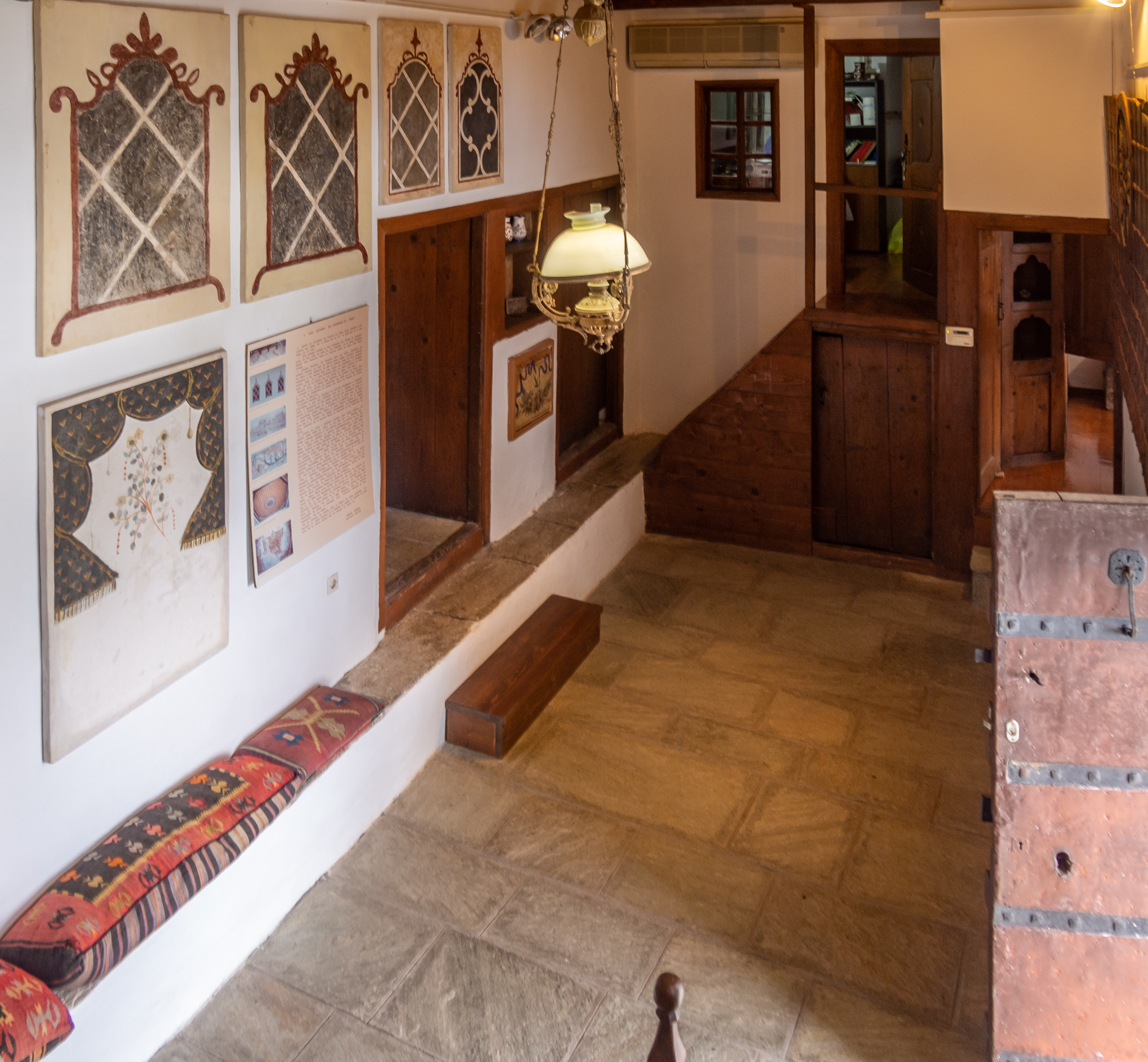
Entrance

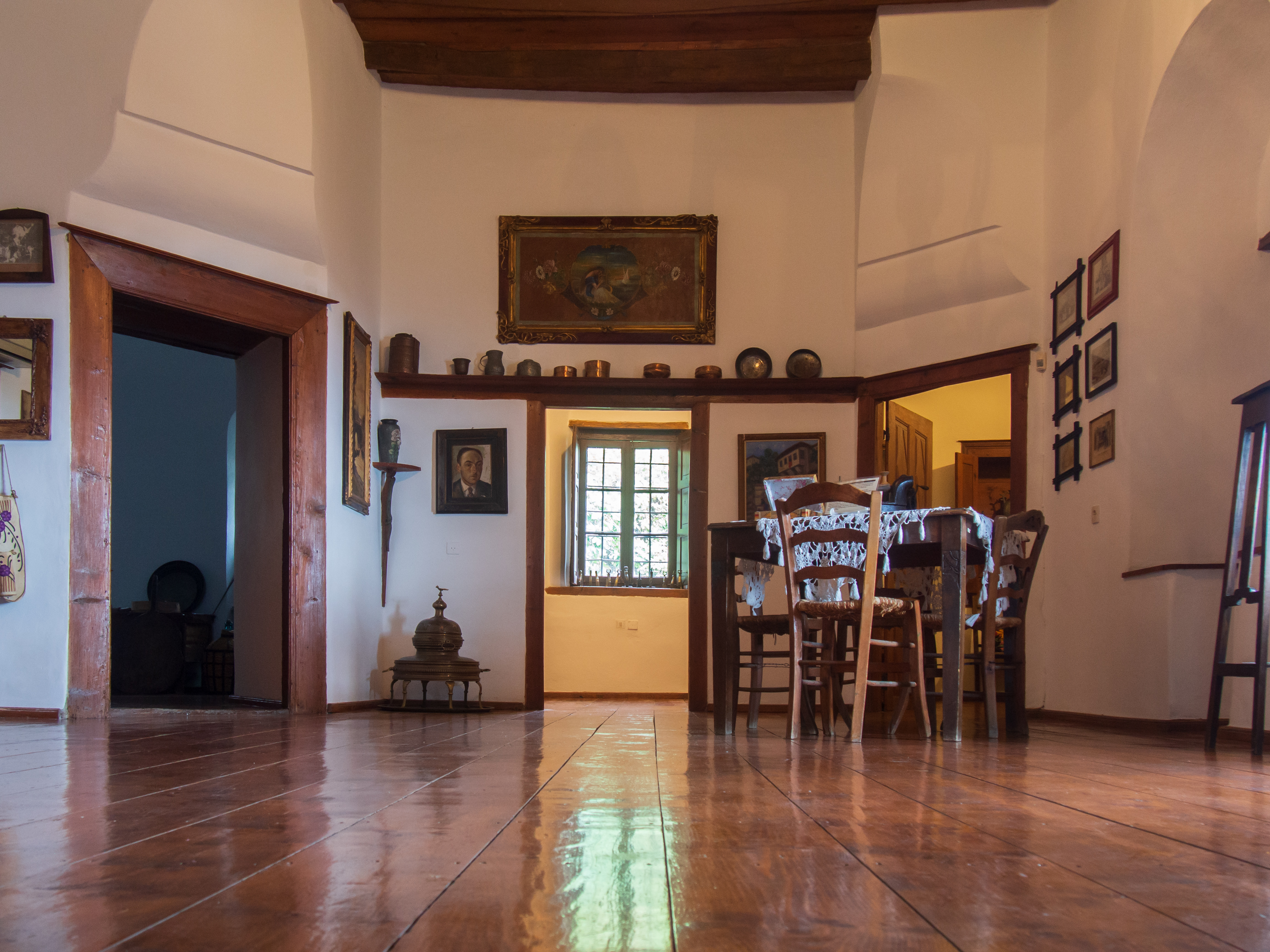
First floor

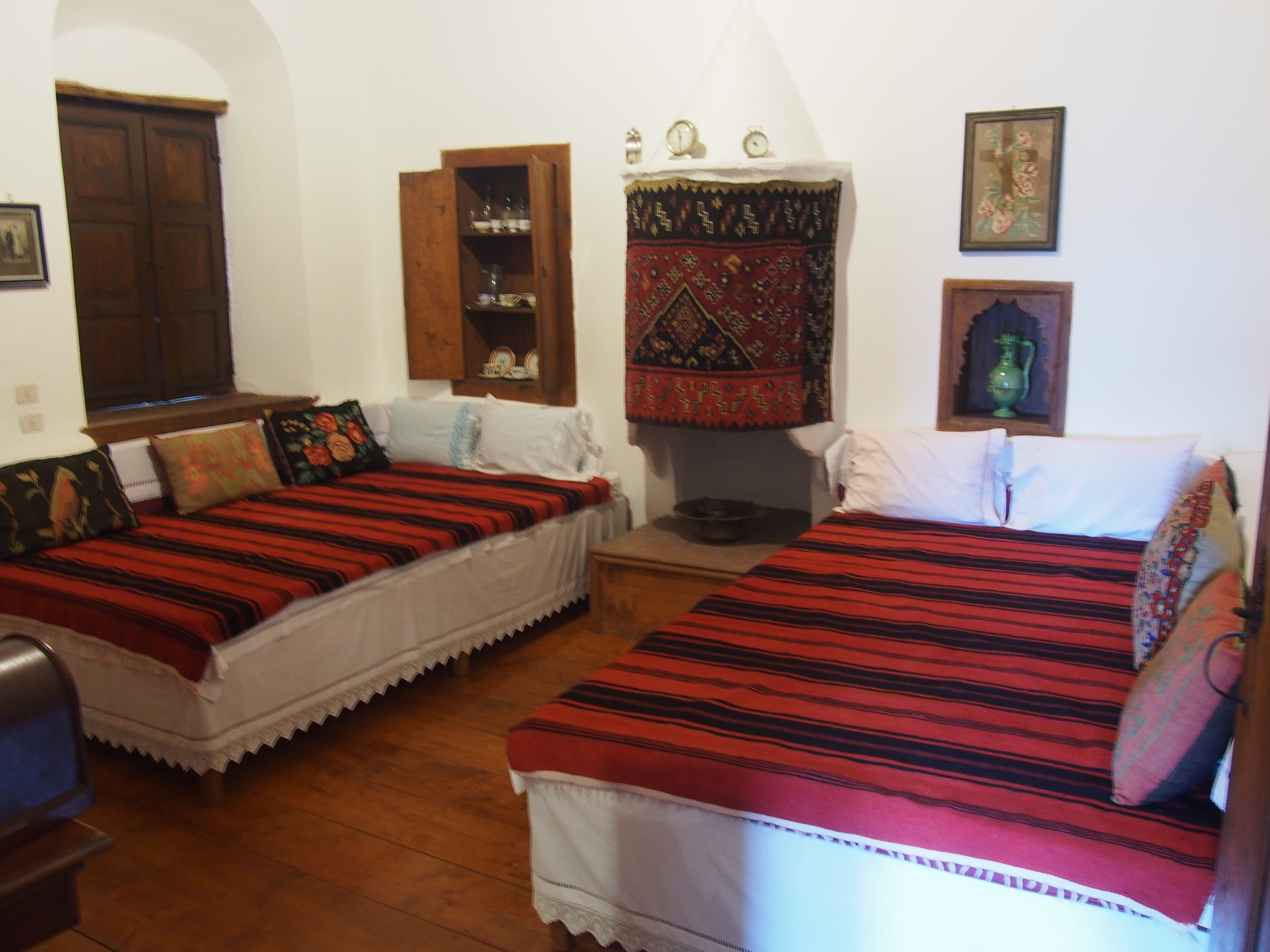
Winter bedroom

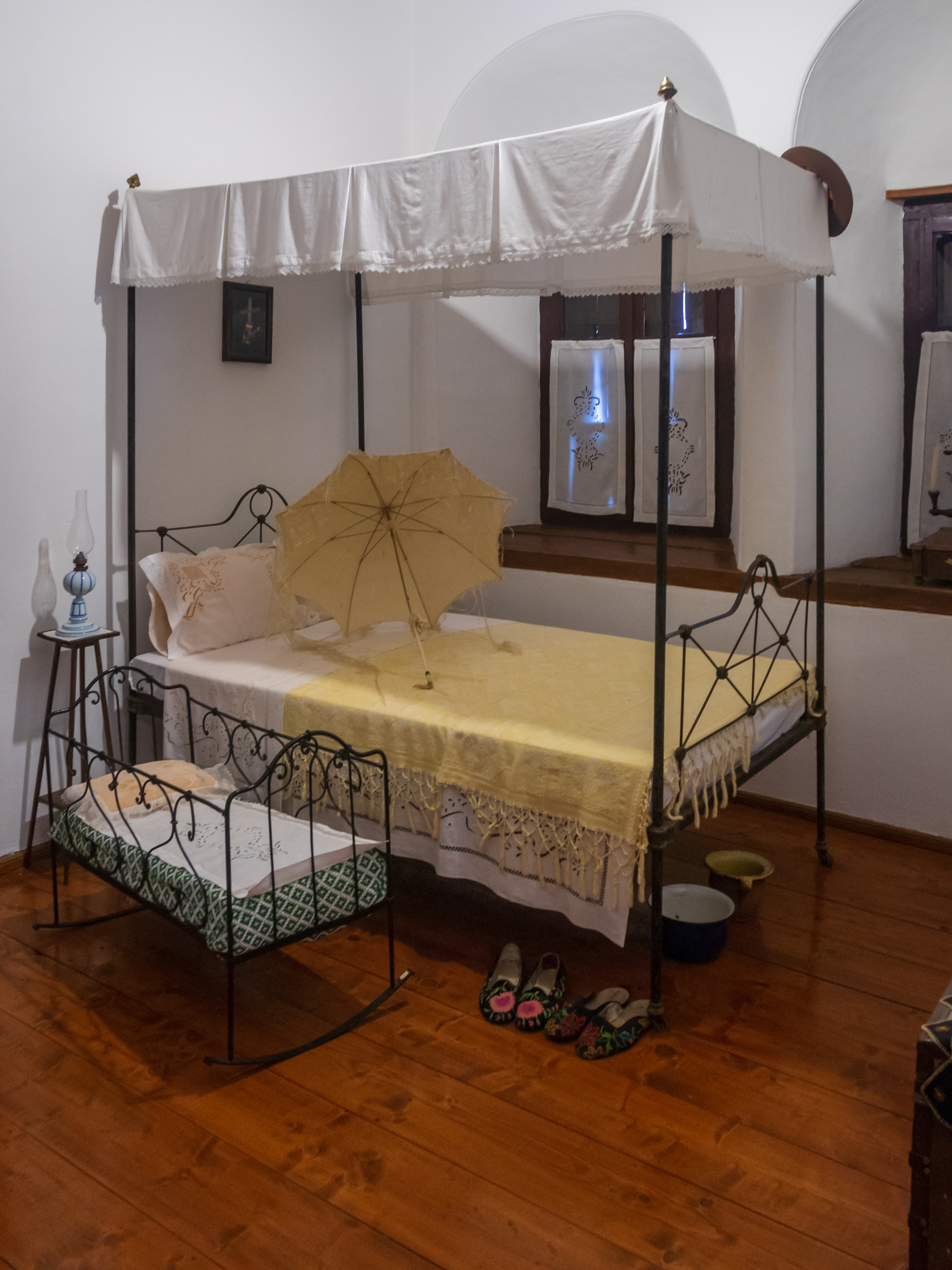
Main bedroom

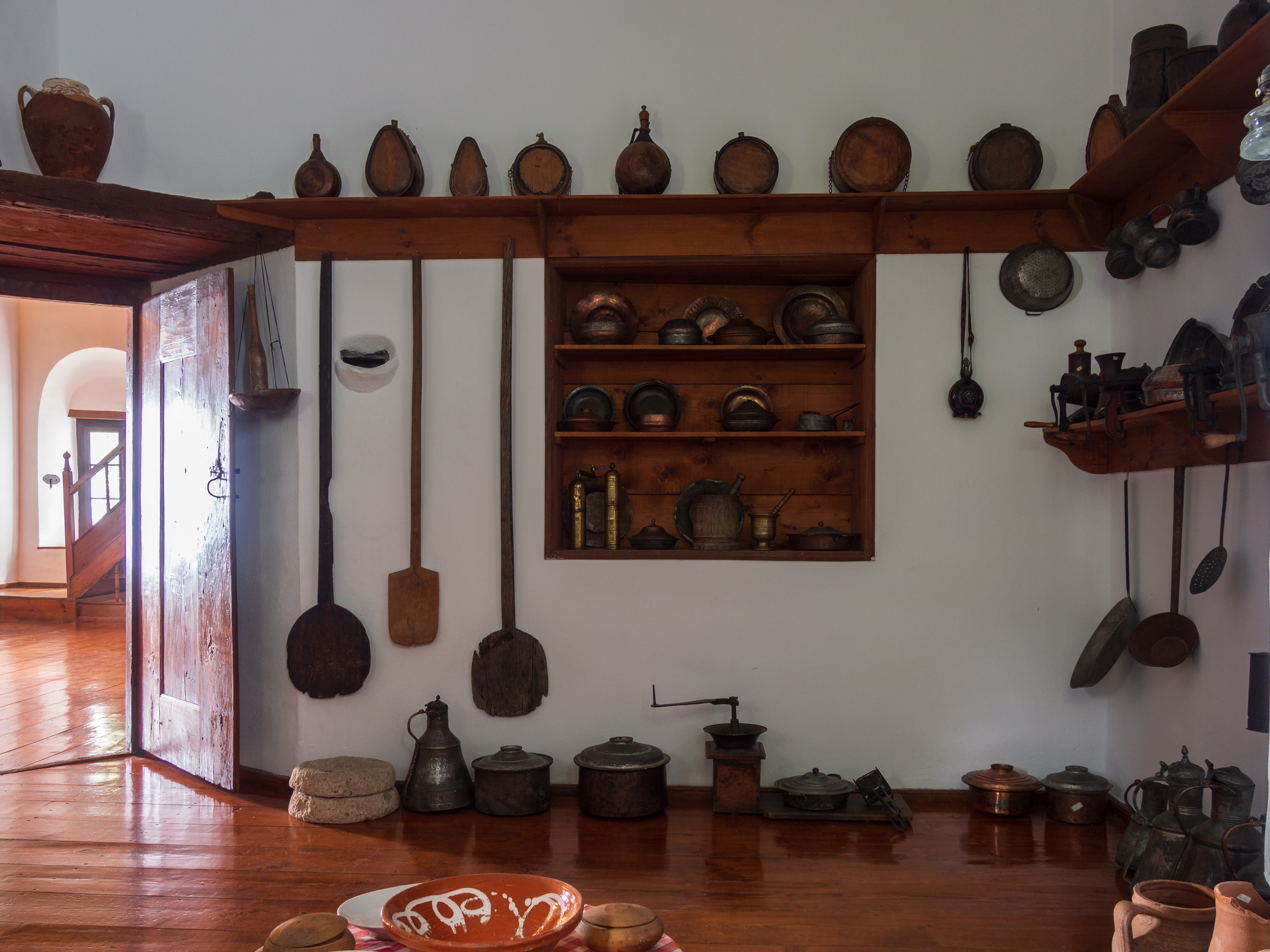
Household utilities exhibition

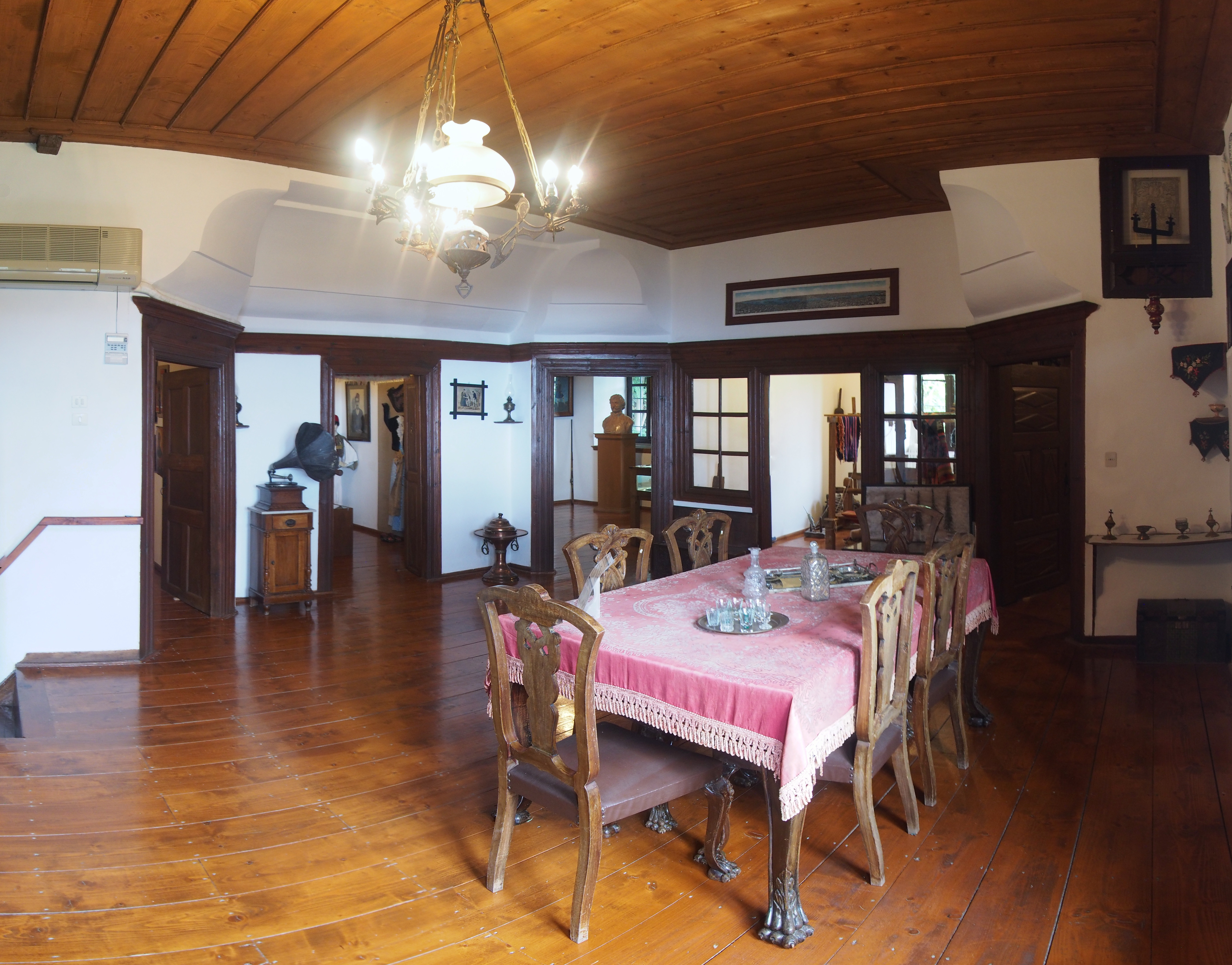
Second floor

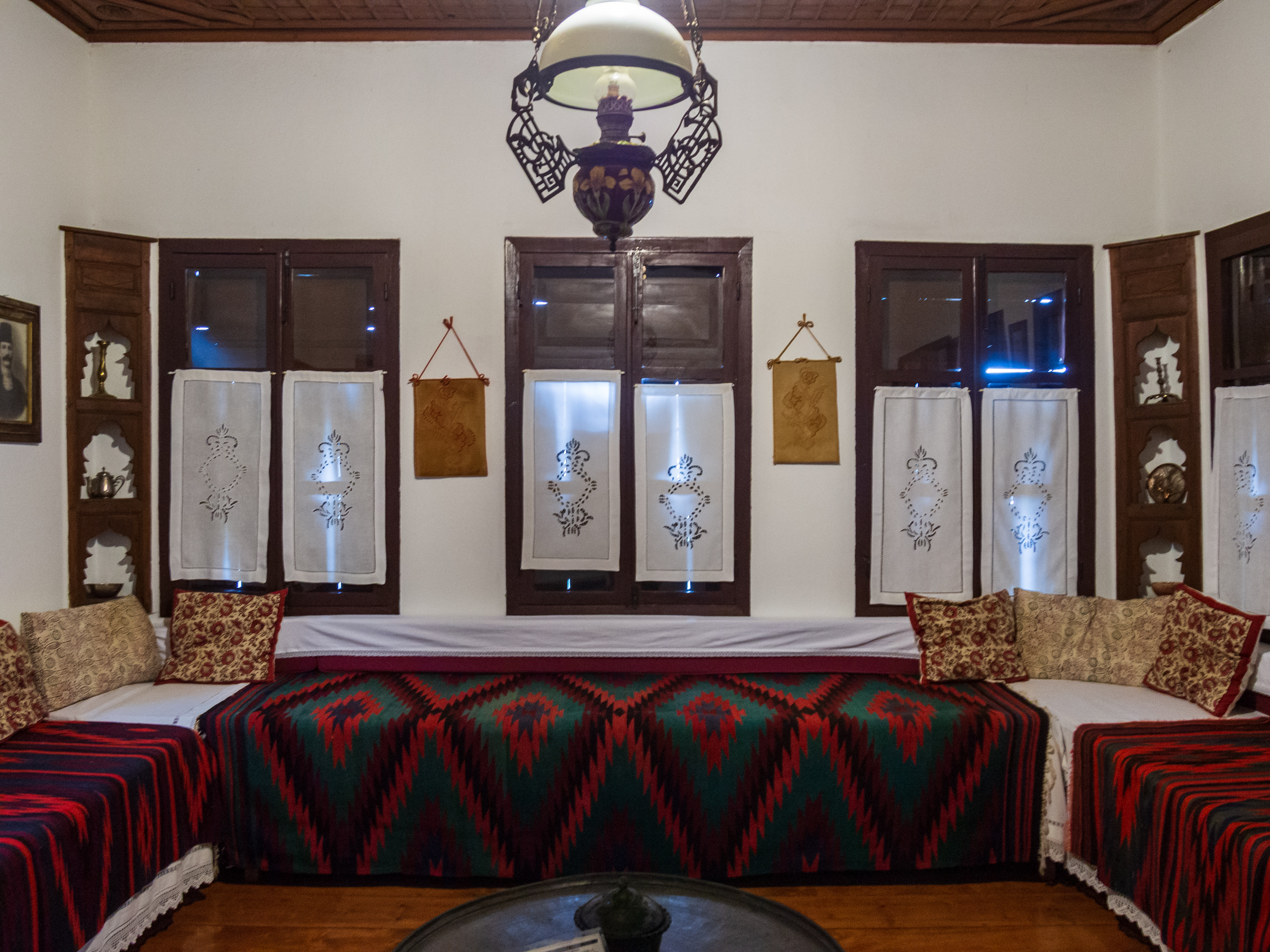
Guest house

== Sources ==
- "Αρχοντικά", Δ.Ε. Μακρινίτσας (in Greek)
- "Αρχοντικό Τοπάλη", Odysseus (in Greek), Ministry of Culture and Sport
- ΕΟΡΤΑΣΤΙΚΟ ΩΡΑΡΙΟ ΣΤΑ ΜΟΥΣΕΙΑ ΚΑΙ ΤΙΣ ΒΙΒΛΙΟΘΗΚΕΣ ΤΟΥ ΔΗΜΟΥ ΒΟΛΟΥ (in Greek), Δημοτικό Κέντρο Ιστορίας, Δήμου Βόλου
- "Μουσείο Λαϊκής Τέχνης και Ιστορίας Πηλίου", Greek Guide
- "Μουσείο Λαϊκής Τέχνης και Ιστορίας Πηλίου", Makrina Pelion (in Greek)
- "Μουσείο Λαϊκής Τέχνης και Ιστορίας Πηλίου", taxidologio (in Greek)
- Μουσείο Λαϊκής τέχνης & ιστορίας Πηλίου (in Greek), VolosInfo
- ΜΟΥΣΕΙΟ ΛΑΪΚΗΣ ΤΕΧΝΗΣ ΚΑΙ ΙΣΤΟΡΙΑΣ ΠΗΛΙΟΥ (in Greek), Δήμος Βόλου
- "Museums and Archaeological sites in Pelion Greece", Around Pelion
- "Pelion Museum of Folklore and History", discoverpelio.com, archived from the original on 2016-03-15
- "Το Μουσείο Λαϊκής Τέχνης και Ιστορίας Πηλίου εγκαινίασε έκθεση", ΡΙΖΟΣΠΑΣΤΗΣ (in Greek), 1997-08-22
