= Keramidi =

Keramidi Κεραμίδι
- Municipal unit
- Location within the regional unit

- Location within Greece
- Coordinates: 39°34′22″N 22°54′40″E
- Country: Greece
- Administrative region: Thessaly
- Regional unit: Magnesia
- Municipality: Rigas Feraios

Area
  - Municipal unit: 111.5 km^{2} (43.1 sq mi)
- Elevation: 284 m (932 ft)

Population (2021)
  - Municipal unit: 358
  - Municipal unit density: 3.21/km^{2} (8.32/sq mi)
- Time zone: UTC+2 (EET)
  - Summer (DST): UTC+3 (EEST)
- Vehicle registration: ΒΟ

Keramidi (Greek: Κεραμίδι) is a village and a former community in Magnesia, Thessaly, Greece. Since the 2011 local government reform it is part of the municipality Rigas Feraios, of which it is a municipal unit. The municipal unit has an area of 111.532 km^{2}. Population 358 (2021).

Keramidi combines mountain and sea. It is situated at 300 meters above sea level and at about 5 kilometers from the north Aegean Sea. It is believed that there was a citadel and supply community at the sea level, dating back to the ancient Greece, which may have been called Kastanea, at the time of Homer. He mentions Kastanea as the locale where the Persian fleet was run ashore by a storm. There exist the remains of a massive-stone, fortified castle, and a legend that the treasures carried by the fleet were brought ashore and buried. The location of the Kastanea Castle is at top of a cliff by the sea, whereas Keramidi was built higher-up at the side of a mountain that is not readily visible from the sea. There, as early as the 17th century, the community of Keramidi grew isolated from the influence of the Turks during the 400-year occupation of Greece by the Ottoman Empire. Until the early 1950s, there was only access to Keramidi by mules and horses, and always by the sea. Kamari, meaning the pride, has been the port/beach for Keramidi. Kamari is now one of the least polluted shores and a summer/vacation hamlet. There is an asphalt-top road that connects Keramidi with Kamari. Also, there is the port and hamlet of Agrilia, where fisherman moor their boats now instead of the beach of Kamari.
