= Boebe (Crete) =

Coordinates: 35°00′20″N 24°52′43″E

Boebe or Boibe (Ancient Greek: Βοίβη) was a town in ancient Crete, which was in the Gortynian district. Scholars tentatively locate Boebe at the modern village of Pompia in the municipal unit of Moires, municipality of Faistos, regional unit of Heraklion.
