= Onchestus (river) =

River of ancient Thessaly

Onchestus or Onchestos (Ancient Greek: Ὀγχηστός), was a river of ancient Thessaly, flowing near Scotussa, through the battlefield of Cynoscephalae into Lake Boebeis. It is perhaps the same river as the Onochonus or Onochonos (Ὀνόχωνος), whose waters were exhausted by the army of Xerxes I during the Persian invasion of Greece. It is true that Herodotus describes this river as flowing into the Peneius; but in this he was probably mistaken, as its course must have been into Lake Boebeis.
