= Makrinitsa =

Makrinitsa Μακρινίτσα
- Municipal unit
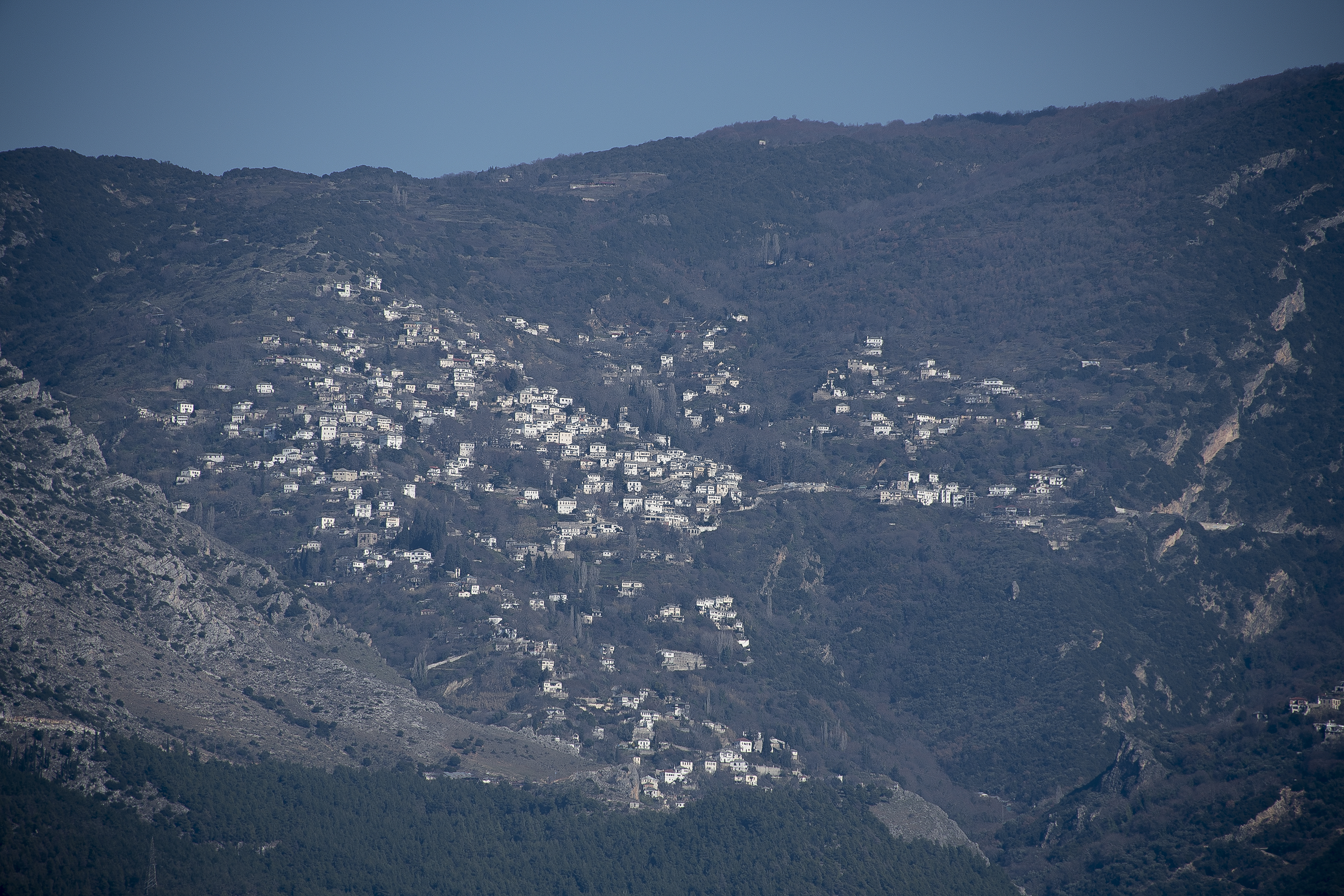
- Makrinitsa

- Location within the regional unit

- Location within Greece
- Coordinates: 39°24′N 22°59′E
- Country: Greece
- Administrative region: Thessaly
- Regional unit: Magnesia
- Municipality: Volos

Area
  - Municipal unit: 59.9 km^{2} (23.1 sq mi)
- Elevation: 600 m (2,000 ft)

Population (2021)
  - Municipal unit: 353
  - Municipal unit density: 5.89/km^{2} (15.3/sq mi)
- Time zone: UTC+2 (EET)
  - Summer (DST): UTC+3 (EEST)
- Postal code: 370 11
- Area code: 24280
- Vehicle registration: ΒΟ

Makrinitsa (Greek: Μακρινίτσα), nicknamed "balcony of Mt. Pelion," is a village and a former community in Magnesia, Thessaly, Greece. Since the 2011 local government reform it is part of the municipality Volos, of which it is a municipal unit. The municipal unit has an area of 59.903 km^{2}.

== Name ==
The name is first attested in the early 13th century through the Makrinitissa Monastery. "Makrinitissa" itself is a more scholarly form of "Makrinitsa", which must have been the colloquial name even at the time. It is of Slavic origin, originally Mokrinitsa, a diminutive form of Mokrina, "wet place", referring to the water-rich environs of the village. The name was Hellenized with the change of the first vowel to "a" from the Greek word makrys, "long".

== Location ==
It is situated in the northwestern part of the Pelion mountains, 6 km northeast of Volos. One of the most characteristic traditional settlements, full of mansions and houses that look like hanging ornaments on the green mountain side. One of the traditional coffee houses is decorated with a fresco by the famous Greek painter Theofilos. The picturesque cobbled paths of Makrinitsa are scattered with traditional water fountains. Makrinitsa is a popular tourist destination, especially during the winter.

The village is the home of the Museum of Folk Art and History of Pelion, housed in the historic Topali Mansion, with over 1,500 objects related to the folk culture and everyday life of the region.

== Historical population ==
Historical population
Year	Pop.	±%
1981	546	—
1991	651	+19.2%
2001	661	+1.5%
2011	694	+5.0%
2021	353	−49.1%

== Gallery ==
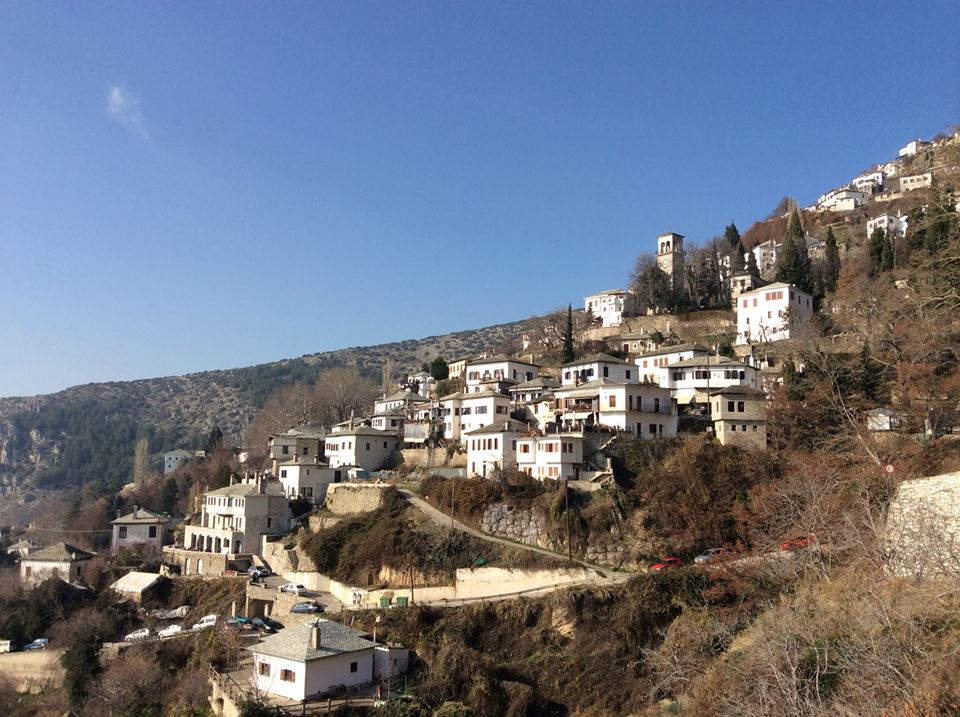
Makrinitsa as seen from Portaria

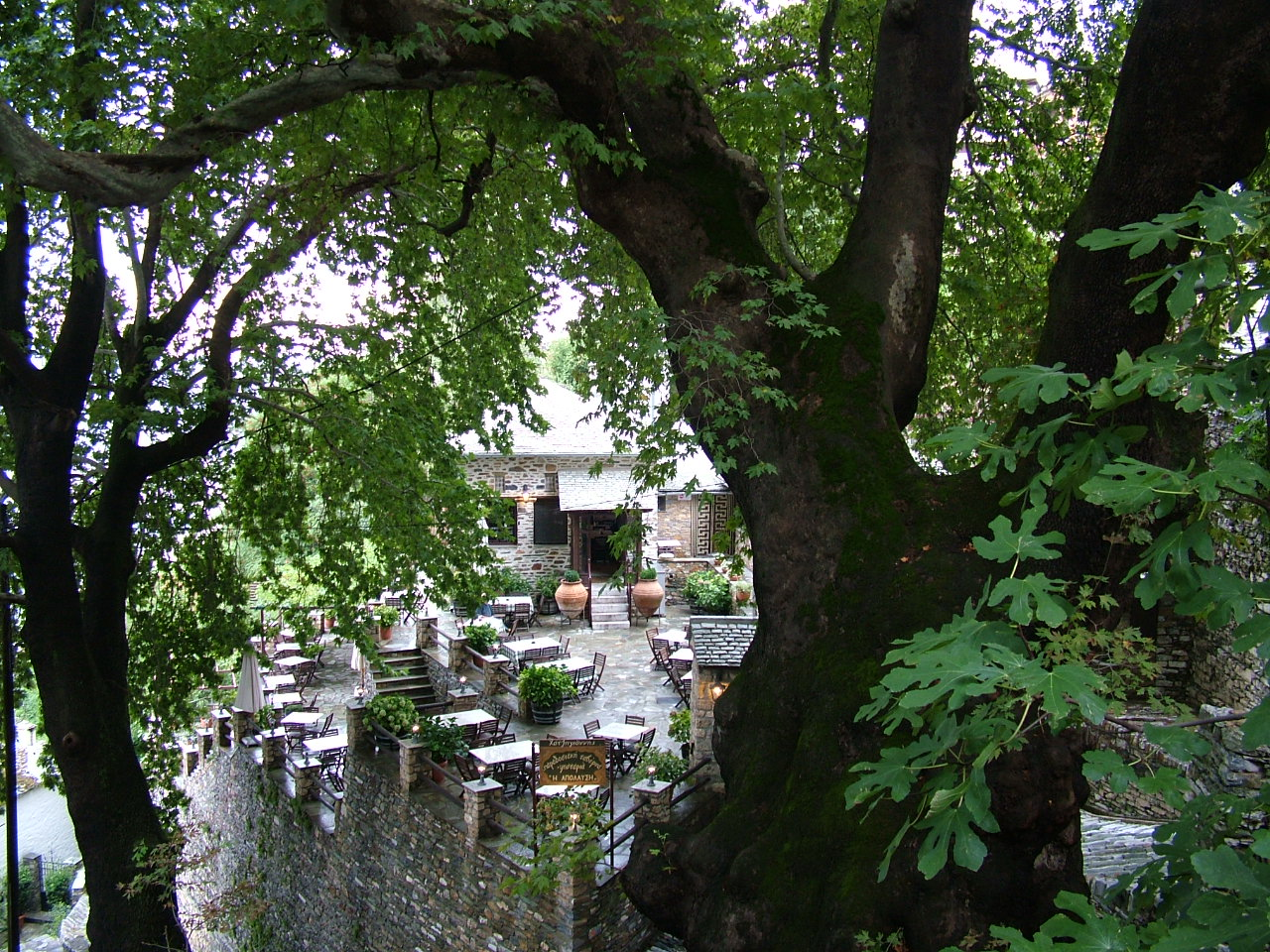
Makrinitsa

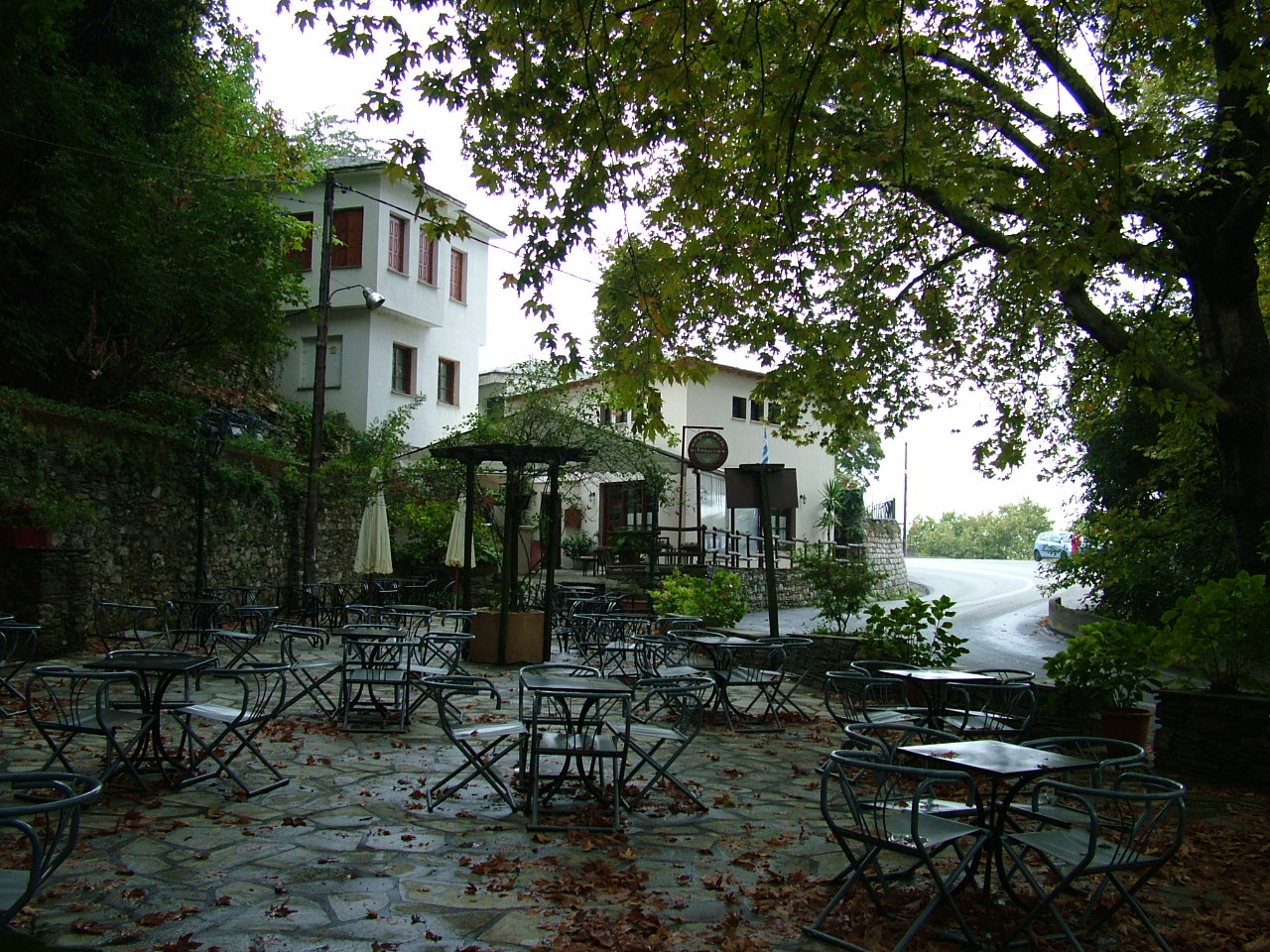
Makrinitsa in autumn

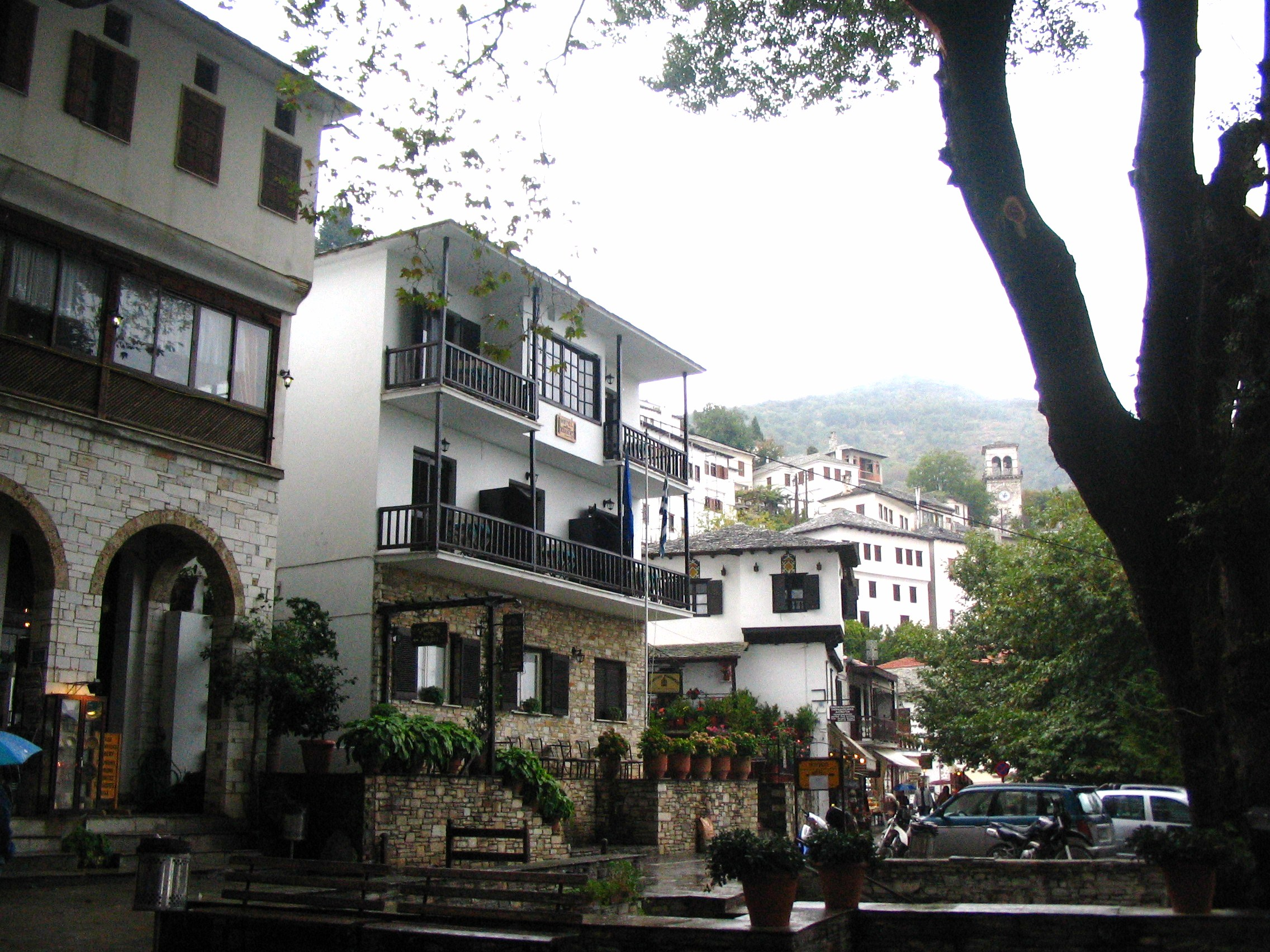
Central Makrinitsa

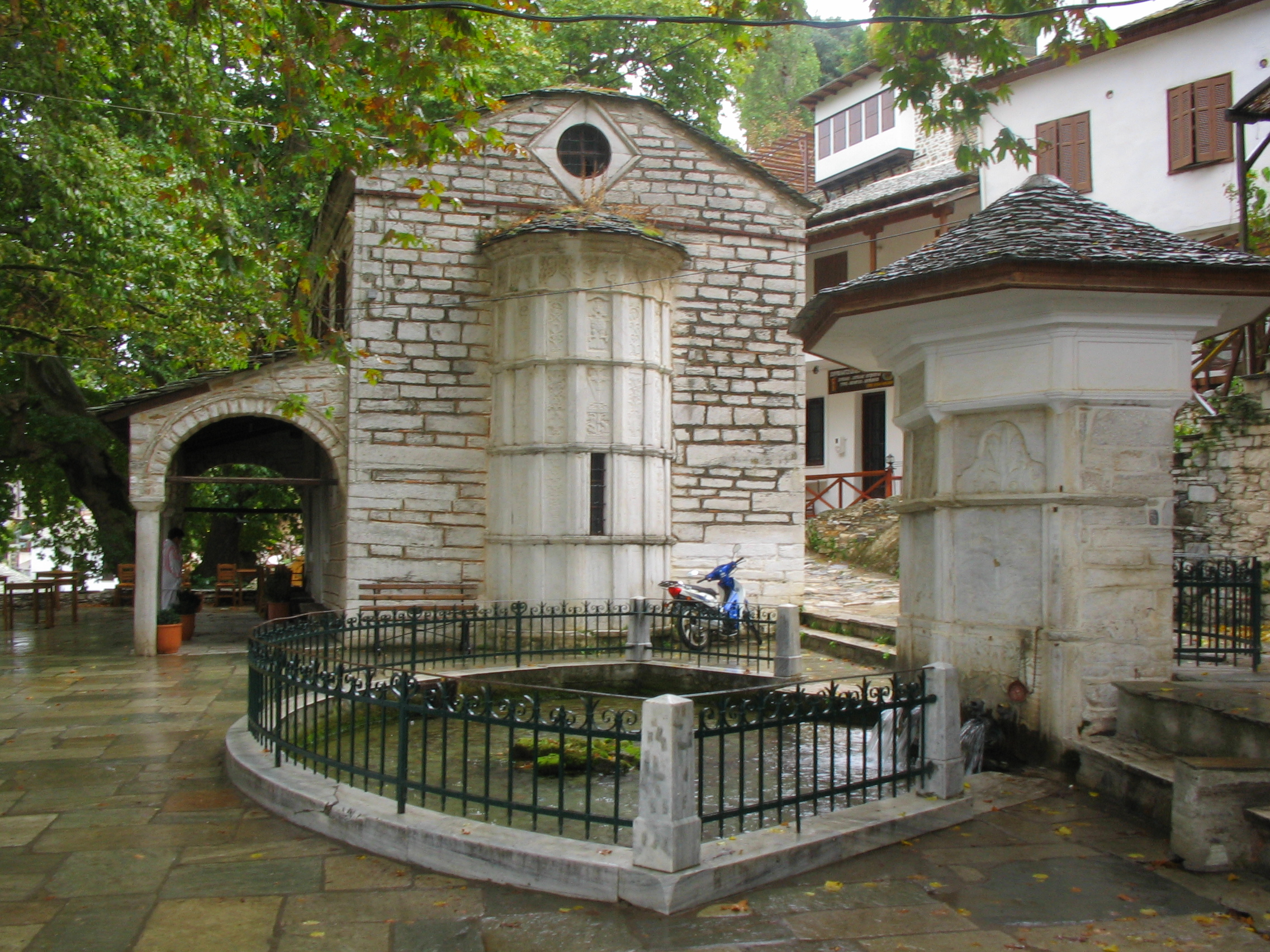
Central Makrinitsa

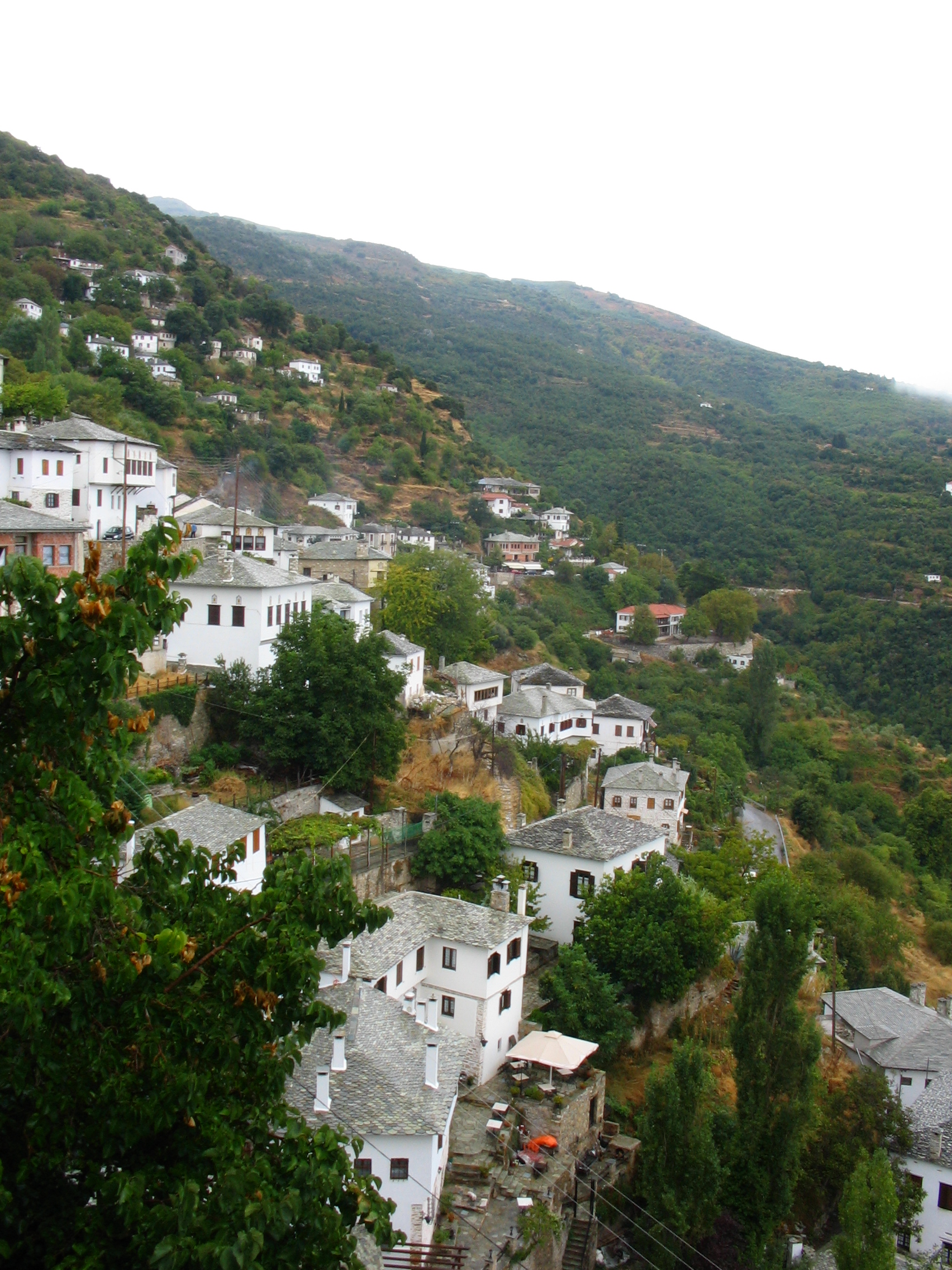
General view of the village

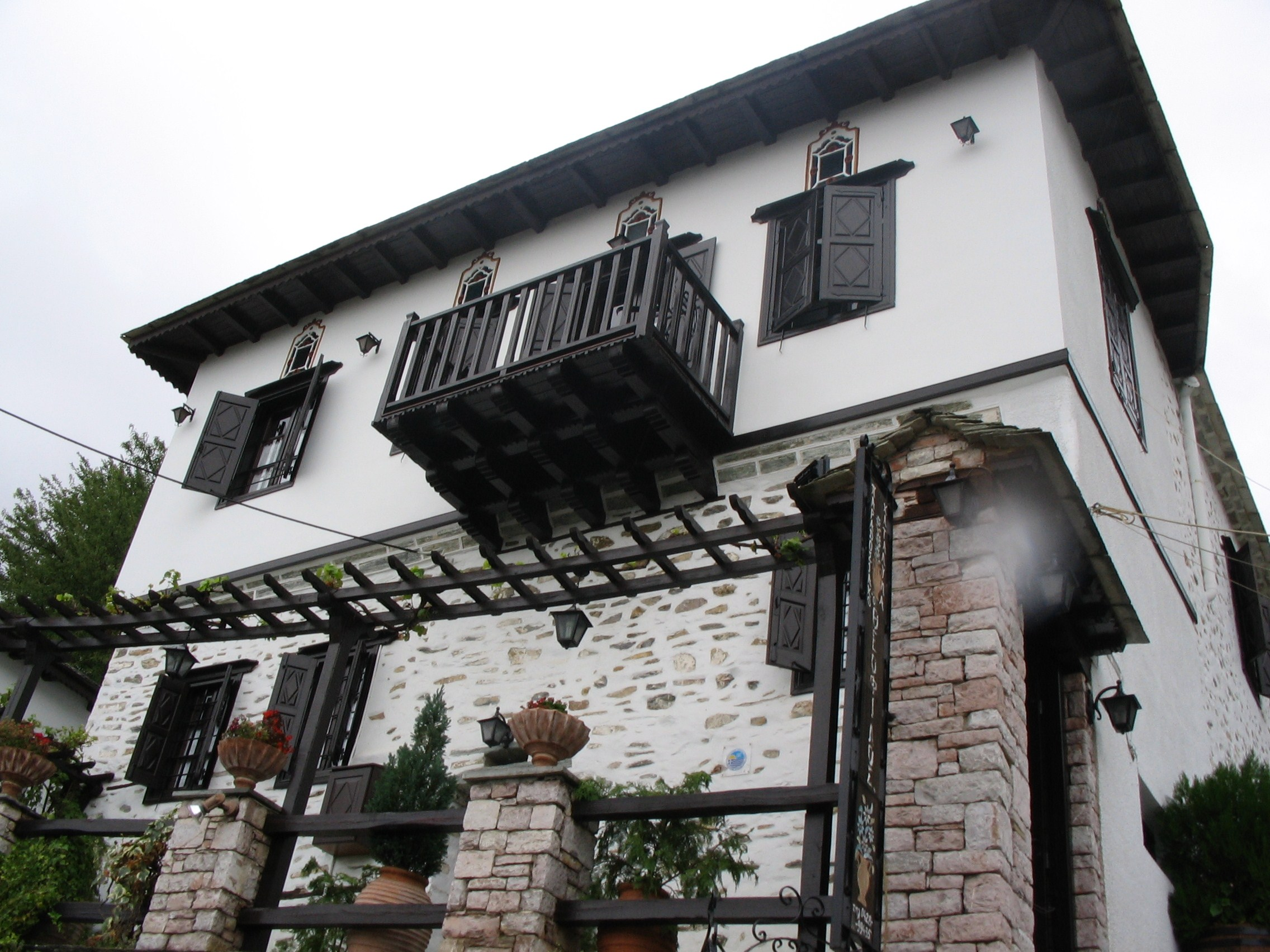
View of a traditional house

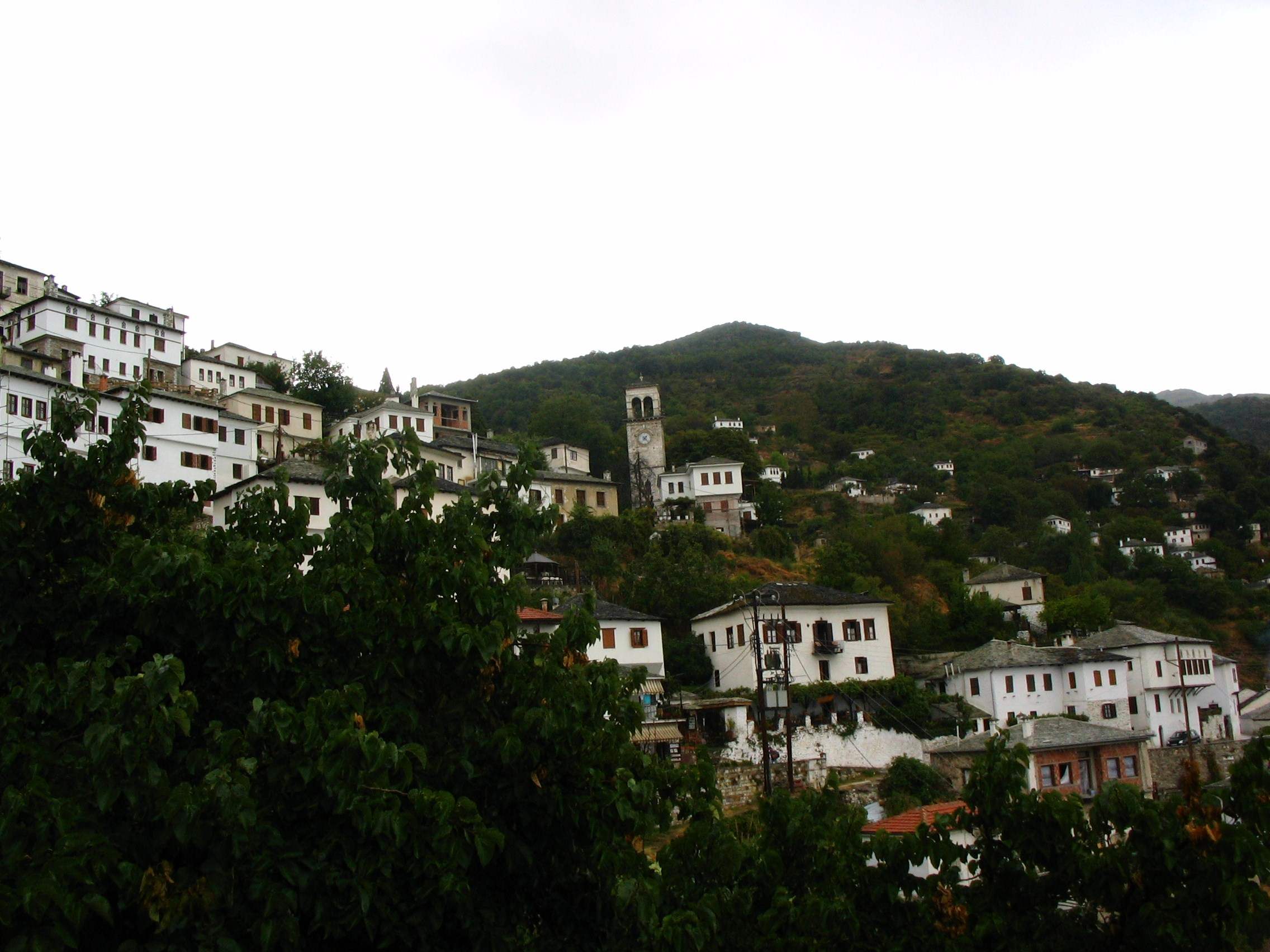

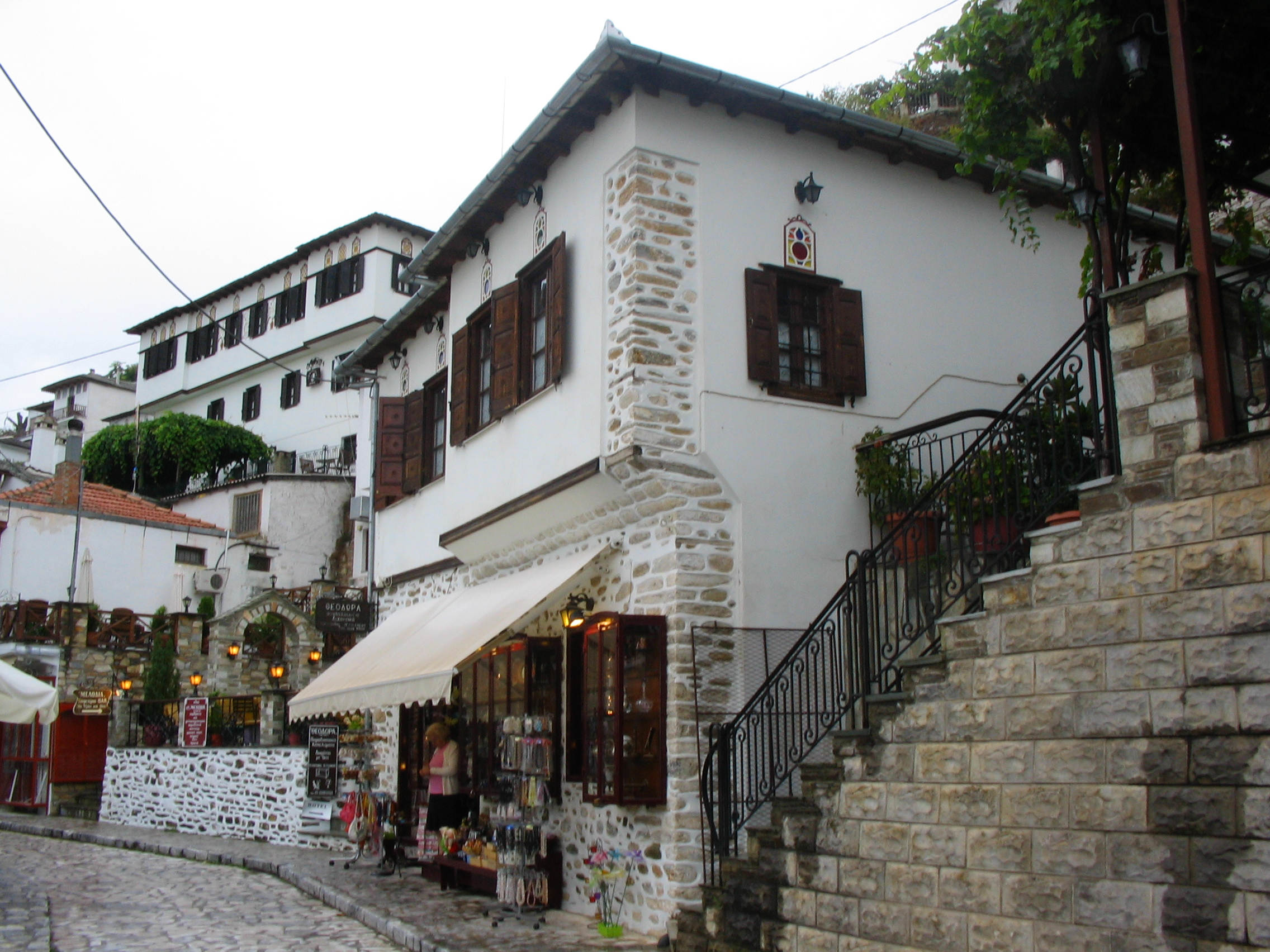

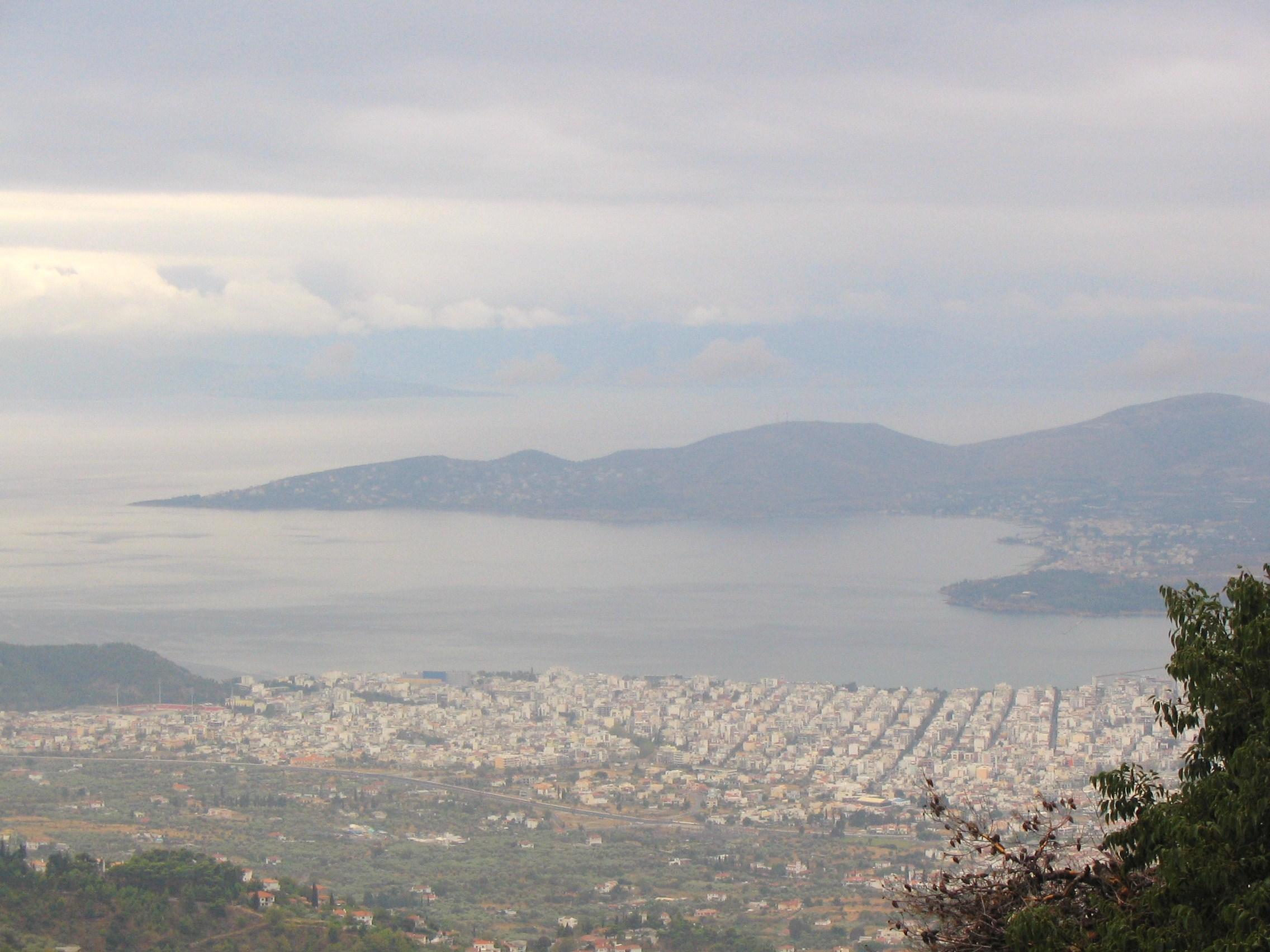
