= Boebe (Thessaly) =

Map showing ancient Thessaly. Boebe is shown to the centre right, in Magnesia, between the lake and the coast.

Boebe or Boibe (Ancient Greek: Βοίβη) was a city of Magnesia in ancient Thessaly, mentioned by Homer in the Catalogue of Ships. It was named after Boebus (Βοίβος), the son of Glaphyrus. It was situated on the eastern side of the lake, called after it Boebeis Lacus. The lake is frequently mentioned by the ancient writers, but the name of the town rarely occurs.

The town of Boebe was used by Demetrius I of Macedon for the foundation of Demetrias, and was at a later time dependent upon it.

Its site is traditionally identified with ruins at Voivis near Kanalia. William Martin Leake visited the site in the 19th century and reported that "It occupied a height advanced in front of the mountain, sloping gradually towards the plain, and defended by a steep fall at the back of the hill. It appears to have been constructed of Hellenic masonry, properly so called. The acropolis may be traced on the summit, where several large quadrangular blocks of stones are still in their places, among more considerable ruins formed of small stones and mortar. Of the town walls there are some remains at a small church dedicated to St. Athanasius at the foot of the hill, where are several large masses of stone showing, by their distance from the acropolis, that the city was not less than two miles [3 km] in circumference."

According to Károly Kerényi, Boebe is a dialectal form of Phoibe, a surname of Artemis.
