= Rigas Feraios (municipality) =

Rigas Feraios Ρήγας Φεραίος
- Municipality
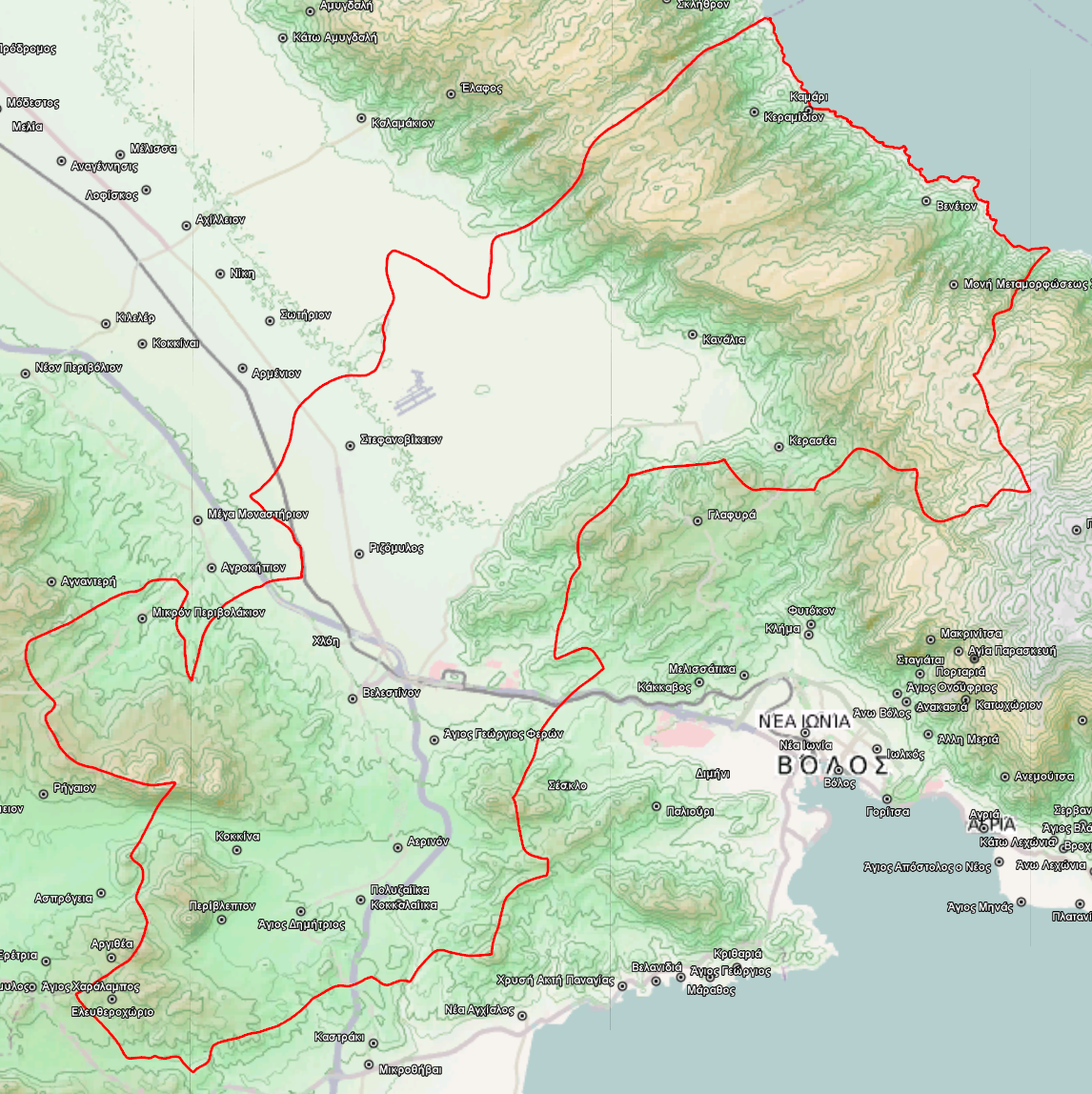
- Rigas Fereos municipality map

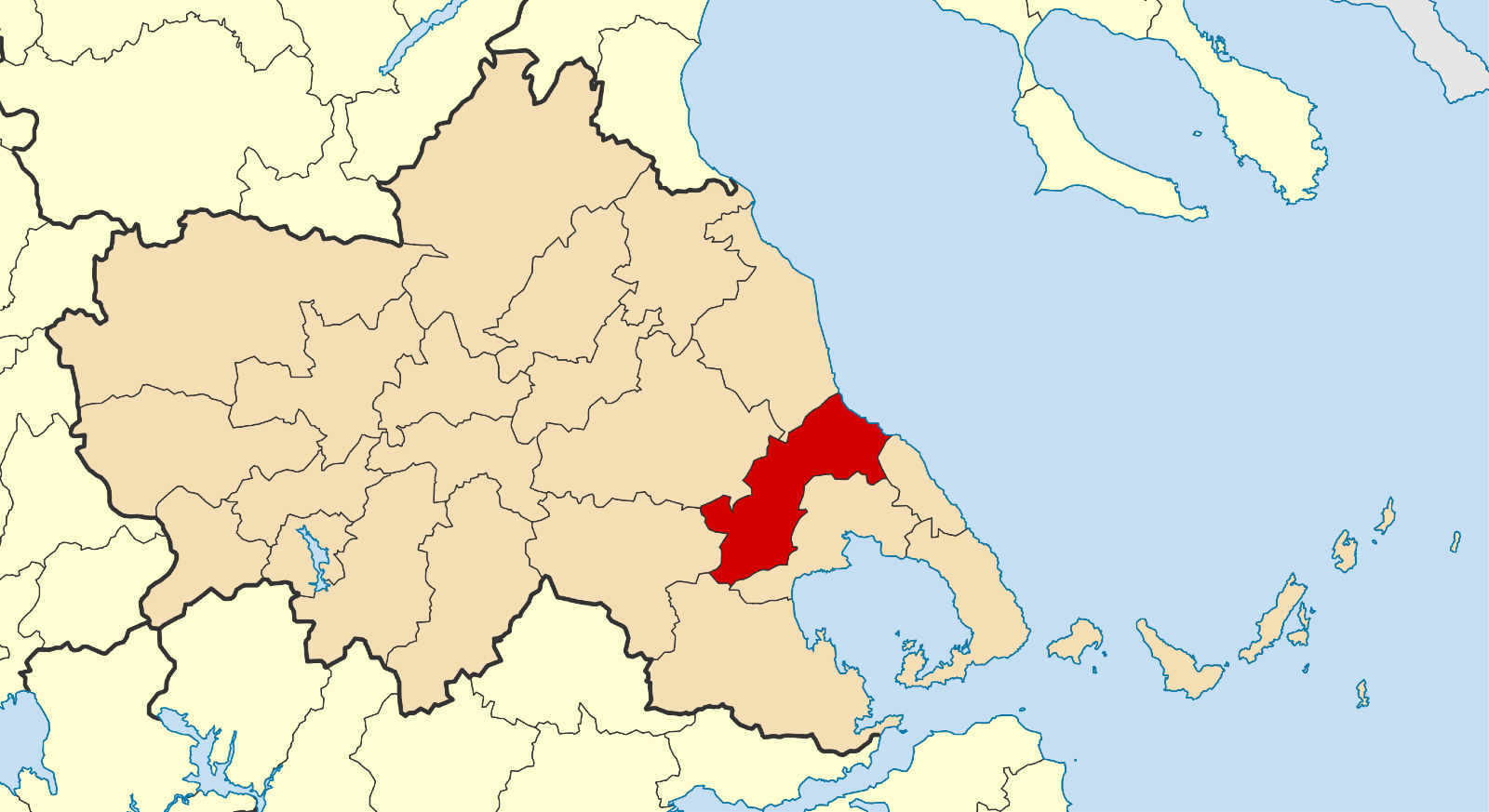

- Location within Greece
- Coordinates: 39°22′N 22°44′E
- Country: Greece
- Administrative region: Thessaly
- Regional unit: Magnesia
- Seat: Velestino

Area
  - Municipality: 550.6 km^{2} (212.6 sq mi)

Population (2021)
  - Municipality: 8,870
  - Density: 16.1/km^{2} (41.7/sq mi)
- Time zone: UTC+2 (EET)
  - Summer (DST): UTC+3 (EEST)

Rigas Feraios (Greek: Ρήγας Φεραίος, [ˈriɣas fɛˈrɛɔs]) is a municipality in the Magnesia regional unit, Thessaly, Greece. The seat of the municipality is the town Velestino. The municipality has an area of 551 km^{2} (213 sq mi). The municipality was named after the Greek writer and revolutionary Rigas Feraios, whose hometown was Velestino.

== Municipality ==
The municipality Rigas Feraios was formed at the 2011 local government reform by the merger of the following 3 former municipalities, that became municipal units:

- Feres
- Karla
- Keramidi
