= Velestino =

Velestino Βελεστίνο Velescir
- Community
- Location within Greece
- Coordinates: 39°22.9′N 22°44.7′E
- Country: Greece
- Administrative region: Thessaly
- Regional unit: Magnesia
- Municipality: Rigas Feraios
- Municipal unit: Feres
- Elevation: 120 m (390 ft)

Population (2021)
  - Community: 3,202
- Time zone: UTC+2 (EET)
  - Summer (DST): UTC+3 (EEST)
- Postal code: 37 500
- Area code: 24250

Velestino (Greek: Βελεστίνο; Aromanian: Velescir) is a town in the Magnesia regional unit, Thessaly, Greece. It is the seat of the municipality Rigas Feraios.

== Location ==
It is situated at 120 metres (390 ft) elevation on a hillside, at the southeastern end of the Thessalian Plain. It is 17 km (11 mi) west of Volos and 40 km southeast of Larissa. Velestino has a train station on the local line from Larissa to Volos. The A1 motorway (Athens–Thessaloniki–Evzonoi) passes east of the town. The Greek writer and revolutionary Rigas Feraios was born in Velestino in 1757.

== History ==
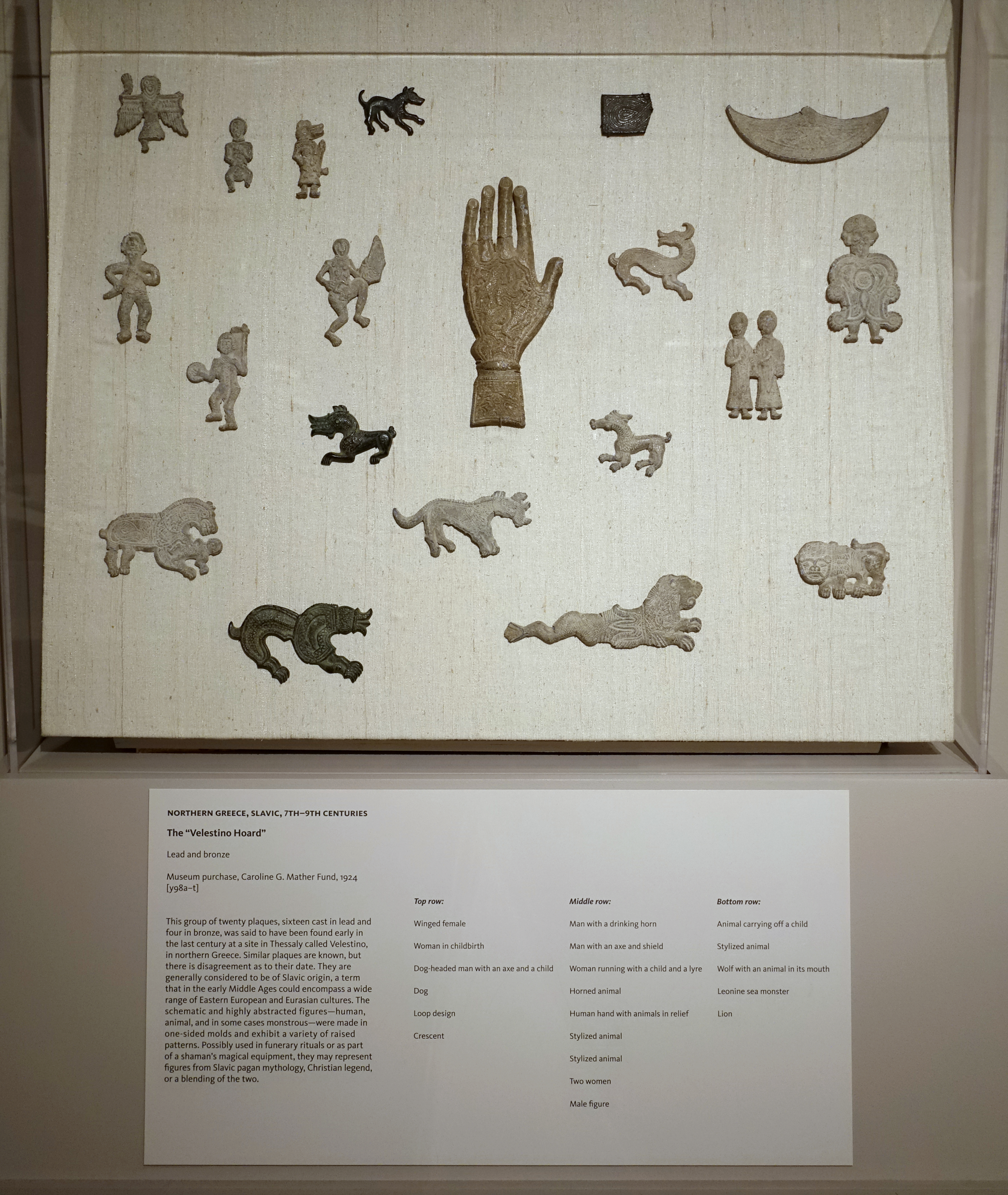
Bronze figures from the Velestino Hoard, discovered in the village of Velestino in the 1920s and dating from as early as the 7th century AD. The findings are linked to the Slavic tribe of the Belegezites.

Velestino is built on the site of ancient Pherae. The ancient settlement is still attested in early Byzantine times, but was apparently abandoned following the Slavic invasions of the 7th century.

The current settlement appears with its current name—probably of Slavic origin—for the first time in 1208, in a letter by Pope Innocent III mentioning its Frankish ruler, Berthold of Katzenelnbogen. In c. 1213 it was part of the jurisdiction of the Latin bishop of Gardiki, Bartholomew (Cardicensis episcopus et Valestinensis). At about the same time, it became a Greek Orthodox episcopal see as well, being attested thereafter in episcopal lists and acts of the Patriarchate of Constantinople. In 1259 an imperial estate (kouratoria) is attested in the area, as part of the province (thema) of Halmyros; by the 1280s, Velestino itself is listed as a separate thema. Very few traces remain of the medieval town today.

Under the Ottoman Empire, Velestino was called Velestin or Velsin and was the seat of a kaza within the Sanjak of Tirhala. With the rest of Thessaly, Velestino was ceded to Greece in 1881 by the Convention of Constantinople. The Battle of Velestino was fought here during the Greco-Turkish War of 1897.

Velestino is a village partly populated by people of Aromanian heritage. Reportedly, as of 1911, Velestino was predominantly Aromanian.
