= Third Sacred War =

War between the Amphictyonic League and the Phocians

Date	356–346 BC
Location	Phocis, Locris, Doris, Boeotia, Thessaly
Result	Amphictyonic League victory

Belligerents
Amphictyonic League; Thebes; Boeotian League; Thessaly; Locris; Doris; Macedon	Phocis; Pherae; Athens; Sparta

Commanders and leaders
Pammenes, Philip II of Macedon	Philomelus, Onomarchos, Phayllos, Phalaikos

The Third Sacred War (356–346 BC) was fought between the forces of the Delphic and Amphictyonic Leagues, principally represented by Thebes, and latterly by Philip II of Macedon, and the Phocians. The war was caused by a large fine imposed in 357 BC on the Phocians by the Amphictyonic League (dominated at that moment by Thebes), for the offense of cultivating sacred land; refusing to pay, the Phocians instead seized the Temple of Apollo in Delphi, and used the accumulated treasures to fund large mercenary armies. Thus, although the Phocians suffered several major defeats, they were able to continue the war for many years, until eventually all parties were nearing exhaustion. Philip II used the distraction of the other states to increase his power in central Greece, in the process becoming ruler of Thessaly. In the end, Philip's growing power, and the exhaustion of the other states, allowed him to impose a peaceful settlement of the war, marking a major step in the rise of Macedon to pre-eminence in Ancient Greece.

== Sources and chronology ==
The ancient sources for the Third Sacred War are scant, and generally lacking in firm chronological information. The main source for the period is Diodorus Siculus's Bibliotheca historica, written in the 1st century BC, which is therefore very much a secondary source. Diodorus is often derided by modern historians for his style and inaccuracies, but he preserves many details of the ancient period found nowhere else. Diodorus worked primarily by epitomizing the works of other historians, omitting many details where they did not suit his purpose, which was to illustrate moral lessons from history; his account of the Third Sacred War therefore contains many gaps.

Beyond Diodorus, further details of the Sacred War can be found in the orations of Athenian statesmen, primarily Demosthenes and Aeschines, which have survived intact. Since these speeches were never intended to be historical material, they must be treated with circumspection; Demosthenes and Aeschines have been described as "a couple of liars, neither of whom can be trusted to have told the truth in any matter in which it was remotely in his interest to lie". Nevertheless, their allusions in speeches to contemporary or past events indicate some of the gaps in Diodorus's account, and help with the arrangement of a chronology. The accounts of Diodorus, Demosthenes and Aeschines can be further supplemented by fragments of otherwise lost histories (such as that by Theopompus) and by contemporary epigraphic sources.

Modern historians' dates for the war have been hotly debated, with no clear consensus. It is generally accepted that the war lasted 10 years, and ended in summer 346 BC (one of the few firm dates), which yields a date of 356 BC for the beginning of the war, with Philomelus's seizure of Delphi. Diodorus's chronology for the sacred war is very confused—he dates the start and end of the war a year too late, variously says the war lasted 9, 10 or 11 years, and included the siege of Methone twice under different dates—and his dates cannot therefore be relied upon.

After Philomelus's defeat at Neon, the Thebans thought it safe to send the general Pammenes to Asia with 5000 hoplites; Pammenes probably met with Philip at Maroneia in 355 BC, presumably on his outward journey. Buckler, the only historian to produce a systematic study of the sacred war, therefore places Neon in 355 BC, and suggests after the meeting with Pammenes, Philip went to begin the siege of Methone. Other historians have placed Neon in 354 BC, because Diodorus says that the battle took place while Philip besieged Methone which Diodorus (at one point) places in 354 BC. Disregarding the dates, most historians agree upon the same sequence of events for the first phases of the Sacred War. The principal question is therefore when that sequence started. Thus, Buckler (as well as Beloch and Cloche) dates Neon to 355 BC, Methone to 355–354 BC, Philip's first Thessalian campaign to 354 BC, and his second to 353 BC. Conversely, Cawkwell, Sealey, Hammond and others lower all these dates by one year, beginning with Neon in 354 BC.

== Background ==
The war was ostensibly caused by the refusal of the Phocian Confederation to pay a fine imposed on them in 357 BC by the Amphictyonic League, a pan-Hellenic religious organisation which governed the most sacred site in Ancient Greece, the Temple of Apollo at Delphi. The fine was occasioned by the Phocians's illegal cultivation of sacred land on the Kirrhaean plain, which they did not deny; the fine was, however, far beyond the Phocians' ability to pay. Under normal circumstances, refusal to pay the fine would have made the Phocians religious (and therefore political) outcasts in Greece, and liable to have a sacred war declared against them.

Behind the religious element, there probably lay a display of realpolitik in bringing charges against the Phocians, instigated by the Thebans. The Phocians had declined to send troops on the Mantinea campaign of 362 BC, despite Theban requests, and this appears to have caused lasting enmity in Thebes. By 357 BC, with the Athenians embroiled in the Social War, and Alexander of Pherae (an erstwhile ally of the Phocians) dead, the Thebans deemed that the chance to punish Phocis had come. The Amphictyonic League was composed of 12 Greek tribes, primarily of central Greece (the Oetaeans, Boeotians, Dolopes, Phthian Achaeans, Locrians, Magnesians, Malians, Perrhaebians, Phocians, Pythians of Delphi and Thessalians), plus the Dorians (including Sparta) and the Ionians (including Athens), with each tribe having two votes in the council of the league. Thebes had effectively become the 'protector' of the league in 360 BC, after the civil war had restarted in Thessaly; the Thessalians having previously been the dominant power in the league. Thus, at this time, Thebes controlled a majority of the votes in the council, and at the autumn meeting in 357 BC, the Thebans were able to have both the Phocians (for the cultivation of the sacred land) and the Spartans (for occupying Thebes some 25 years previously) denounced and fined. Since the fines for both parties were "unjustifiably harsh", the Thebans probably expected neither party to pay, and thus to be able to declare a sacred war on either. There seems to have been some sympathy in Greece for the Phocians, since other states could see that "the Thebans...had used the Amphictyony to pursue petty and destructive vendettas".

The Phocians held a special conference to decide what action to take. Philomelus, a citizen of Ledon, advocated a pre-emptive policy of seizing Delphi (which was situated within the boundaries of Phocis), and asserting the ancient claim of Phocis to the presidency of the Amphictyonic League. In this way, the Phocians could annul the judgment against themselves. The Phocians voted in favour of his proposal, and Philomelus was appointed strategos autokrator (general with independent powers) by the confederacy, with his chief supporter Onomarchos also elected as strategos. Philomelus travelled to Sparta to discuss his proposals with the Spartan king Archidamos III. Archidamos expressed his support, hoping that the Spartan fine would also be annulled, and gave Philomelus 15 talents to raise troops with.

== Seizure of Delphi ==
On his return to Phocis, Philomelus began assembling a mercenary army using the 15 talents from Archidamos, and also raised a force of 1000 peltasts from amongst the Phocian citizenry. In approximately July 356 BC, Philomelus marched on Delphi, just before the end of the period in which the Phocians had been required to pay their fine. He easily captured the city of Delphi, along with the sanctuary of Apollo. Philomelus captured the nobles of the Thrakidai family, who had probably been involved in imposing the fine on Phocis, and killed them, seizing their wealth to add to his treasury. He promised the other Delphians that he would not harm them, although he had initially contemplated enslaving the whole city.

=== Ozolian Locrian expedition to Delphi ===
The news of Philomelus's move against Delphi resulted in a relief expedition being mounted by the Ozalian Locrians, probably mainly from Amphissa. Philomelus's army met the Locrians in open battle on a small plain between the city of Delphi and the sanctuary, and routed them with heavy losses. Some prisoners were taken, and Philomelus had them thrown from the cliffs that tower over the sanctuary (the Phaidriadai rocks). This was the traditional punishment for sacrilege against Apollo's temple, and through the means of this atrocity, Philomelus was asserting the Phocian claim to the presidency of the sanctuary. Buckler observes that "in his first acts, Philomelus set a brutal stamp on the war".

=== Fortification of Delphi ===
After defeating the Locrians, Philomelus continued to strengthen his position in Delphi. He destroyed the stones which recorded the verdict against the Phocians, and abolished the government of the city, installing in its place a group of pro-Phocian Delphians, who had been in exile in Athens. Philomelus ordered the sanctuary be fortified on the western side (natural features defended the other approaches), and a large limestone wall was constructed. He then demanded that the priestess of Apollo (the Pythia) provide him with an oracle; she replied that he "could do whatever he wanted". Philomelus called that an oracle, and had it inscribed in the sanctuary, as was customary. This pseudo-oracle provided Philomelus with supposed divine justification from Apollo for his actions. He next sent embassies to all Greek states, asserting the Phocian claim to Delphi, and promising not to touch the treasury of Apollo; Buckler suggests that he did not expect the Greeks to acquiesce to his actions, but hoped to draw support away from the Amphictyons. The Spartans, as expected, endorsed Philomelus's actions, since their fine was now erased, whilst Athens also expressed support, following their general anti-Theban policies.

=== Declaration of Sacred War ===
However, Philomelus's embassies elsewhere met with failure. The Locrians demanded that the Amphictyons avenge them and Apollo, and the Thebans sent embassies to the other council members suggesting that a sacred war should be declared against Phocis. This was assented to by most Greek states, including the Amphictyonic council members (minus Sparta and Athens), and those well-disposed to Thebes; furthermore, otherwise uninvolved states declared support for the Amphictyonic for reasons of piety. The Amphictyons seem to have decided that the year was too advanced to begin campaigning, and so agreed to launch military action the following year. They may have hoped that in the meantime, the Phocians' sacrilegious behaviour would cause them to reconsider their position.

== Start of the War (c. 355 BC) ==
Following the declaration of war against Phocis, Philomelus decided he would need to substantially increase the size of his army. Rather than levy the Phocian citizen body, Philomelus decided to hire more mercenaries; the only way he could afford to do this was by plundering the dedications in the treasury of Apollo. That the treasury contained much wealth, from years of accumulated donations, is well-established; it is estimated that the Phocians spent some 10,000 talents of Apollo's treasure during the war. In order to overcome the reluctance of mercenaries to fight for a sacrilegious cause, Philomelus increased the rate of pay by half, which allowed him to recruit a force of 10,000 troops over the winter, for the forthcoming war.

=== Conflict in Epicnemidian Locris and Phocis (c. 355 BC) ===
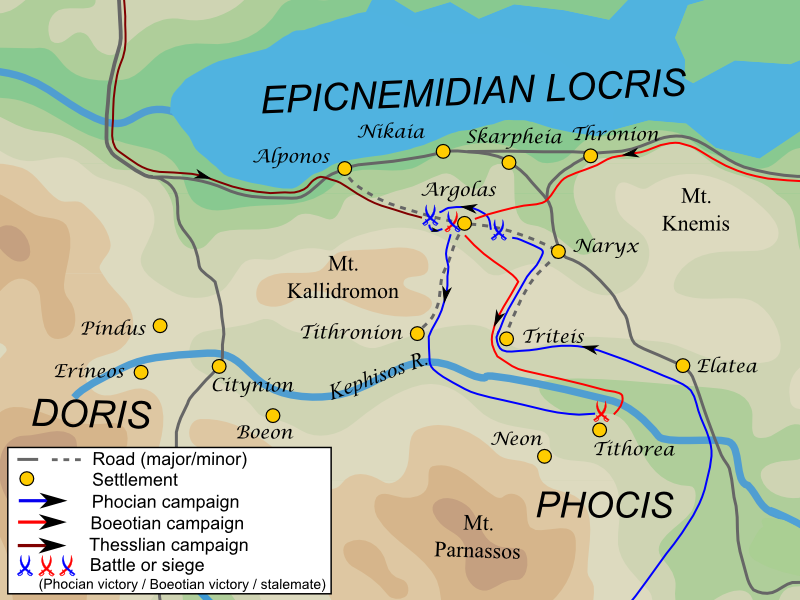
Phocian, Boeotian and Thessalian campaigns in 355 BC

The following spring, possibly upon hearing news that the Boeotians were ready to march against Phocis, Philomelus took the initiative and marched into Epicnemidian Locris. Since the Phocian army would be outnumbered by the whole Amphictyonic levy, it is probable that he sought to defeat his enemies one by one, starting with the Locrians. If he could defeat the Locrians, then he was in a position to occupy the narrow pass of Thermopylae and block the union of the Thessalian and Boeotian armies, the main Amphictyonic contingents. Philomelus's army thus crossed into Locris, probably using the Fontana pass from Triteis to Naryx, or possibly the Kleisoura pass from Tithronion to the same general area of Locris. The Locrians sent a force of cavalry to oppose him, which the Phocians easily defeated. However, this battle gave the Thessalians time to pass through Thermopylae and arrive in Locris. Philomelus immediately attacked the Thessalians, and defeated them near the town of Argolas, whose location is not definitively known. Buckler suggests, on the basis of topographical considerations, that the modern village of Mendenitsa must be ancient Argolas.

Philomelus then laid siege to Argolas, but failed to capture it, and instead pillaged as much Locrian territory as possible. The Boeotian army, under the command of Pammenes, then arrived on the scene, and rather than oppose them, Philomelus backed off, allowing the Boeotians to link up with the Locrians and Thessalians. Philomelus had thus failed in his strategy of dealing with the Amphictyons separately, and he now faced an army at least equal in size to his own. He therefore decided to retreat before the Amphictyons could bring him to battle, and probably using the Kleisoura pass, he returned with his army to Phocis.

==== Battle of Neon ====
In response to Philomelus's retreat, Pammenes ordered the Amphictyonic force to cross into Phocis as well, probably by the Fontana pass, in order to prevent Philomelus marching on Boeotia. The two armies converged on Tithorea (whose acropolis, Neon, gives the battle its name), where the Amphictyons brought the Phocians to battle. Details of the battle are scant, but the Amphictyons defeated the Phocians, and then pursued the survivors up the slopes of Mount Parnassos, slaying many. Philomelus was injured, and rather than risk capture, threw himself off the mountain, falling to his death. Onomarchos, who was second in command, managed to salvage the remainder of the army, and retreated to Delphi, whilst Pammenes retired to Thebes with the Boeotian army.

== Second phase (c. 354–353 BC) ==
The Amphictyons seem to have concluded that their victory at Neon had effectively ended the war, and the Phocians would sue for peace. Otherwise, it is difficult to understand why Pammenes did not march on Delphi, or even sack the undefended Phocian cities in the Kephisos valley. In failing to follow up their victory, the Amphictyons wasted the best opportunity they had during the course of the war to end it. The Thebans seem to have been so sure that the war was ended that they agreed to send 5,000 hoplites under Pammenes to help the rebellion of the Persian satrap Artabazus, shortly after the Battle of Neon. The Thebans needed the money Artabazos offered them, and although they had generally been on good terms with the Persian king, they obviously felt the offer was too good to refuse. It is likely the troops were dispatched before the Phocian decision to fight on became clear, unless the Thebans thought that their remaining troops were a match for any army the Phocians could field. This was to prove a serious mistake for the Thebans, and the Amphictyonic cause in general.

Rather than contemplate surrender after the retreat from Neon, Onomarchos had rallied the Phocians, and insisted that they should continue the war. A meeting of the Phocian Confederation was held to discuss the future course of action, to which their Athenian and Spartan allies were invited. If they surrendered, the Phocians would face additional fines for their sacrilege, and for plundering the treasury; however, to fight on meant perpetrating still further sacrilege, and effectively committed the Phocians to winning a total victory against the Amphictyons. Whilst some were inclined towards peace, the majority were swayed by Onomarchos's orations and policies, quite possibly backed up by the threat of force from the mercenary army, and voted to continue the war. Buckler highlights the particular importance of the Phocian mercenary force on the decisions made by (or for) the Phocian Confederation during the course of the war, and also the peculiar consequences it had for the Phocians: "The primary loyalty of that army would go to its commander and paymaster, not to the Phocian Confederacy. In effect, continued war forced the Phocians to put their faith in the hands of a man who could act regardless of their wishes but the responsibility for whose acts would be theirs."

His position now secure, Onomarchos had his chief opponents arrested and executed, and confiscated their property to add to his war-chest. He then set about raising a new army, doubling the size of Philomelus's force, until he had 20,000 men and 500 cavalry at his disposal. Raising such a large force required extensive depredations of Apollo's wealth; bronze and iron dedications were melted down and recast as weapons, whilst gold and silver offerings were melted down and used to make coinage. Although raising such a large army would have taken a considerable time, Onomarchos had the whole winter after Neon in which to do so.

=== First Phocian campaign in Epicnemidian Locris (c. 354 BC) ===
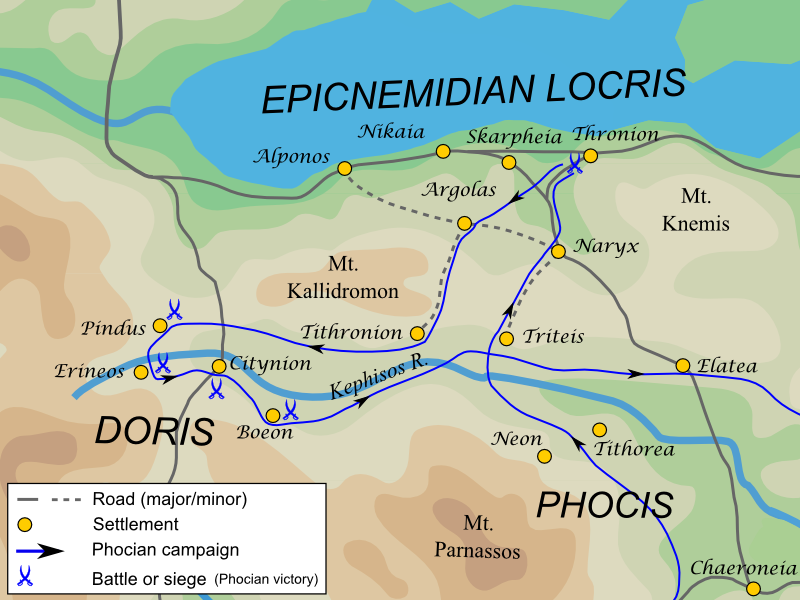
First Phocian campaign in Epicnemidian Locris and Doris, 354 BC

=== First Phocian campaign in Boeotia (c. 354 BC) ===
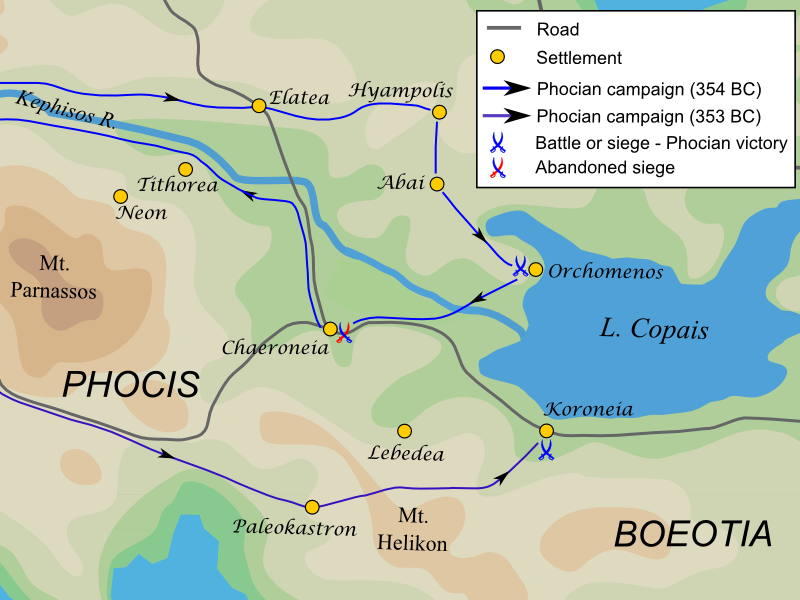
First and second Phocian campaigns in Boeotia, 354–353 BC

=== First conflict in Thessaly (c. 354 BC) ===
The Sacred War appears to have laid way for renewed conflict within Thessaly. The Thessalian Confederation were in general staunch supporters of the Amphictyonic League, and had an ancient hatred of the Phocians. Conversely, the city-state of Pherae had allied itself with the Phocians. In either 354 or 353 BC the ruling clan of the city of Larissa appealed to Philip II of Macedon to help them defeat Pherae.

Thus, Philip brought an army into Thessaly, probably with the intention of attacking Pherae. Under the terms of their alliance, Lycophron of Pherae requested aid from the Phocians, and Onomarchos dispatched his brother, Phayllos with 7,000 men; however, Philip repulsed this force before it could join up with the Pheraeans. Onomarchos then abandoned the siege he was currently prosecuting, and brought his whole force into Thessaly to attack Philip. It is possible that Onomarchos hoped to conquer Thessaly in the process, which would both leave the Thebans isolated (Locris and Doris having already fallen to the Phocians), and give the Phocians a majority in the Amphictyonic council, thus enabling them to have the war declared over. Onomarchos probably brought with him 20 000 infantry, 500 cavalry and a large number of catapults, and outnumbered Philip's army. The exact details of the campaign that followed are unclear, but Onomarchos seems to have inflicted two defeats on Philip, with many Macedonians killed in the process. Polyaenus suggests that the first of Onomarchos's victories was aided by the use of the catapults to throw stones into the Macedonian phalanx, as it climbed a slope to attack the Phocians. After these defeats, Philip retreated to Macedon for the winter. He is said to have commented that he "did not run away but, like a ram, I pulled back to butt again harder".

=== Second Phocian campaign in Boeotia (c. 353 BC) ===
In 353 BC, Onomarchos took advantage of the fact that Thebes, financially exhausted, sent out a troop of 5,000 Theban soldiers as mercenaries to support the revolt of Artabazus, satrap of Hellespontine Phrygia, against the Persian king. He led an attack against Locris and captured Thronion, which constituted a key strategic point on the route network of central mainland Greece. He turned south and invaded Doris and eventually Boeotia, where he was finally controlled by the allied Boeotians close to Chaeronea.

=== Second conflict in Thessaly (c. 353 BC) ===
Philip returned to Thessaly the next summer (either 353 or 352 BC, depending on the chronology followed), having gathered a new army in Macedon. Philip formally requested that the Thessalians join him in the war against the Phocians; the Thessalians, even if underwhelmed by Philip's performance the previous year, realistically had little choice if they wanted to avoid being conquered by Onomarchos's army. Philip now mustered all the Thessalian opponents of Pherae that he could, and according to Diodorus, his final army numbered 20,000 infantry and 3,000 cavalry.

==== Pagasae ====
At some point during his campaigns in Thessaly, Philip captured the strategic port of Pagasae, which was in effect the port of Pherae. It is unclear whether this was during the first or second campaign; both Buckler and Cawkwell suggest that it took place in the second campaign, before the Battle of Crocus Field. By taking Pagasae, it is possible that Philip prevented Pherae from being reinforced by sea during his second campaign. Buckler suggests that Philip had learnt his lesson from the previous campaign, and intended to cut Pherae off from outside help before attacking it.

==== Battle of Crocus Field ====
Meanwhile, Onomarchos returned to Thessaly to try to preserve the Phocian ascendancy there, with approximately the same force as during the previous year. Furthermore, the Athenians dispatched Chares to help their Phocian allies, seeing the opportunity to strike a decisive blow against Philip. Subsequent events are unclear, but a battle was fought between the Macedonians and the Phocians, probably as Philip tried to prevent the Phocians uniting forces with the Pheraeans, and crucially, before the Athenians had arrived. According to Diodorus, the two armies met on a large plain near the sea, probably in the vicinity of Pagasae. Philip sent his men into battle wearing crown of laurel, the symbol of the Apollo; "as if he was the avenger...of sacrilege, and he proceeded to battle under the leadership, as it were, of the god". In the ensuing battle, the bloodiest recorded in ancient Greek history, Philip won a decisive victory against the Phocians. In total, 6,000 Phocian troops were killed including Onomarchos, and another 3,000 taken prisoner. Onomarchos was either hanged or crucified and the other prisoners drowned, as ritual demanded for temple-robbers. These punishments were designed to deny the defeated an honourable burial; Philip thus continued to present himself as the pious avenger of the sacrilege committed by the Phocians.

==== Re-organisation of Thessaly ====
It was probably in the aftermath of his victory (if not before) that the Thessalians appointed Philip archon of Thessaly. This was an appointment for life, and gave Philip control over all the revenues of the Thessalian Confederation, and furthermore made Philip leader of the united Thesslian army.

Philip was now able to settle Thessaly at his leisure. He first probably finished the siege of Pagasae, to deny the Athenians a landing place in Thessaly. Pagasae was not part of the Thessalian Confederation, and Philip therefore took it as his own, and garrisoned it. The fall of Pagasae now left Pherae totally isolated. Lycophron, rather than suffer the fate of Onomarchos, struck a bargain with Philip, and in return for handing Pherae over to Philip, he was allowed, along with 2000 of his mercenaries, to go to Phocis. Philip now worked to unite the traditionally fractious cities of Thessaly under his rule. He took direct control of several cities in western Thessaly, exiling the dissidents, and in one case refounding the city with a Macedonian population; he tightened his control of Perrhaebia, and invaded Magnesia, also taking it as his own and garrisoning it; "when finished, he was lord of Thessaly."

==== Thermopylae ====
Once satisfied with his reorganisation of Thessaly, Philip marched south to the pass of Thermopylae, the gateway to central Greece. He probably intended to follow up his victory over the Phocians by invading Phocis itself, a prospect which greatly alarmed the Athenians, since once he was past Thermopylae, he could also march on Athens. The Athenians therefore dispatched a force to Thermopylae and occupied the pass; there is some debate as to whether other contingents may have joined the Athenians at Thermopylae. The Athenians were certainly there, since the Athenian orator Demosthenes celebrated the defense of the pass in one of his speeches. Cawkwell suggests that the Athenian force was the one that Diodorus says was dispatched under Nausicles consisting of 5,000 infantry and 400 cavalry, and that they were joined by the remnants of the Phocians and the Pheraean mercenaries. However, Buckler argues that Diodorus never mentions Thermopylae, and the force under Nausicles was sent to help the Phocians the following year; instead, he believes that another Athenian force held the pass unassisted. Although it might have proved possible to force the pass, Philip did not attempt to do so, preferring not to risk a defeat after his great successes in Thessaly.

== Third phase (c. 352–346 BC) ==
Meanwhile, the Phocians regrouped under Onomarchos's brother, Phayllos. After the huge Phocian defeats at Neon and Crocus Field, Phayllos had to resort to doubling the pay for mercenaries, in order to attract enough to replenish his army. Despite their defeats however, the majority of the Phocians were still in favour of continuing the war. Over the winter of that year, Phayllos engaged in diplomatic efforts to gather more support from Phocis's allies, and succeeding in widening the theatre of conflict in the next campaigning season. Uniquely in Greek history, the Phocians were able to absorb huge losses in manpower, thanks to their pillaging of Temple of Apollo, a factor which was to contribute to the war dragging on indecisively until 346 BC.

=== Third Phocian campaign in Boeotia (352 BC) ===
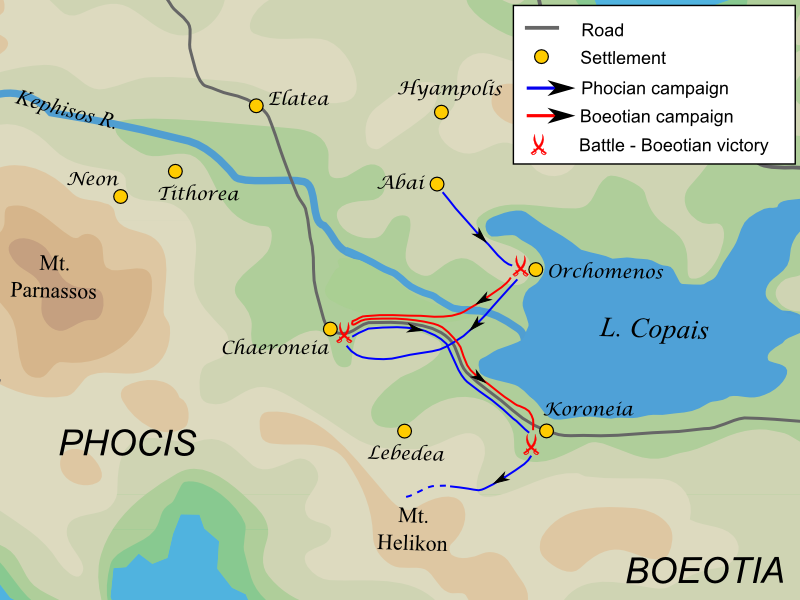
Third Phocian campaign in Boeotia, 352 BC

=== Fourth Phocian campaign in Boeotia (351 BC) ===
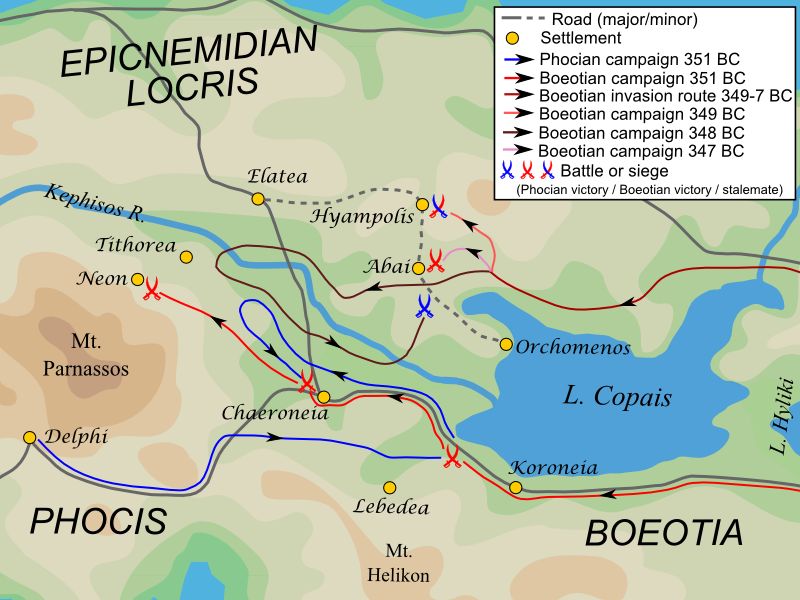
Fourth Phocian campaign in Boeotia, and second, third and fourth Boeotian campaigns in Phocis, 351–347 BC

=== Fifth Phocian campaign in Boeotia (349 BC) ===
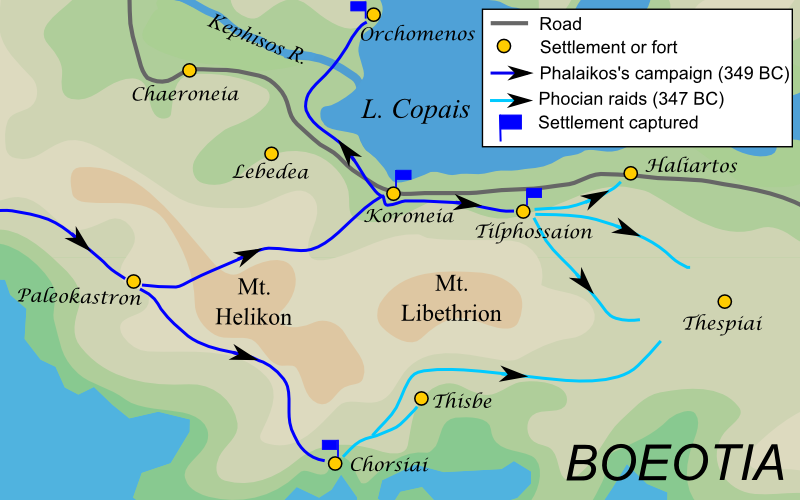
Fifth and sixth Phocian campaigns in Boeotia, 349–347 BC

=== Fourth Boeotian campaign in Phocis (347 BC) ===
Philip had not involved himself in the Sacred War since his victory at the Crocus Field in 352 BC. In the meantime, it had become clear that the Sacred War could only be ended by outside intervention. The Phocians had occupied several Boeotian cities, but were running out of treasure to pay their mercenaries; conversely, the Thebans were unable to act effectively against the Phocians. The Phocian general Phalaikos was removed from his command in 347 BC, and three new generals appointed, who successfully attacked Boeotia again.

The Thebans appealed to Philip for aid, and he sent a small force to their assistance. Philip sent force enough to honour his alliance with Thebes, but not enough to end the war—he desired the glory of ending the war personally, in the manner of his choosing, and on his terms.

== Settlement of the Sacred War ==
=== Preliminaries ===
Athens and Macedon had been at war since 356 BC, after Philip's capture of the Athenian colonies of Pydna and Potidea. Philip had then been drawn into the Sacred War, on behalf of the Thessalians, as described above. Since Athens was also a combatant in the Sacred War, the war between Athens and Macedon was inextricably linked with the progress of the Sacred War. In 352 BC, Philip's erstwhile ally, the Chalcidian League (led by Olynthos), alarmed by Philip's growing power, sought to ally themselves with Athens, in clear breach of their alliance with Philip. In response, Philip attacked Chalcidice in 349 BC, and by 348 BC, had completely destroyed the Chalkidian League, razing Olynthos in the process. The prominent Athenian politician Philocrates had suggested offering Philip peace in 348 BC, during the Olynthian war. The war between Athens and Philip thus continued through 347 BC, as did the Sacred War.

In early 346 BC, Philip let it be known that he intended to march south with the Thessalians, though not where or why. The Phocians thus made plans to defend Thermopylae, and requested assistance from the Spartans and the Athenians, probably around 14 February. The Spartans dispatched Archidamus III with 1,000 hoplites, and the Athenians ordered everyone eligible for military service under the age of 40 to be sent to the Phocians' aid. However, between the Phocians' appeal and the end of the month, all plans were upset by the return of Phalaikos to power in Phocis; the Athenians and the Spartans were subsequently told that they would not be permitted to defend Thermopylae. It is not clear from the ancient sources why Phalaikos was returned to power, nor why he adopted this dramatic change of policy. Cawkwell suggests, based on remarks of Aeschines, that the Phocian army restored Phalaikos because they had not been properly paid, and further that Phalaikos, realizing that the army could not be paid and that the Phocians could no longer hope to win the war, decided to try to negotiate a peace settlement with Philip.

=== Peace between Macedon and Athens ===
When the Athenians received this news, they rapidly changed policy. If Thermopylae could no longer be defended, then Athenian security could no longer be guaranteed. By the end of February, the Athenians had dispatched an embassy, including Philocrates, Demosthenes and Aeschines, to Philip to discuss peace between Athens and Macedon. The embassy had two audiences with Philip, in which each side presented their proposals for the terms of the peace settlement. The embassy then returned to Athens to present the proposed terms to the Athenian assembly, along with a Macedonian embassy, empowered by Philip to finalize an agreement. On 23 April, the Athenians swore to the terms of the treaty in the presence of the Macedonian ambassadors.

=== Embassies to Philip ===
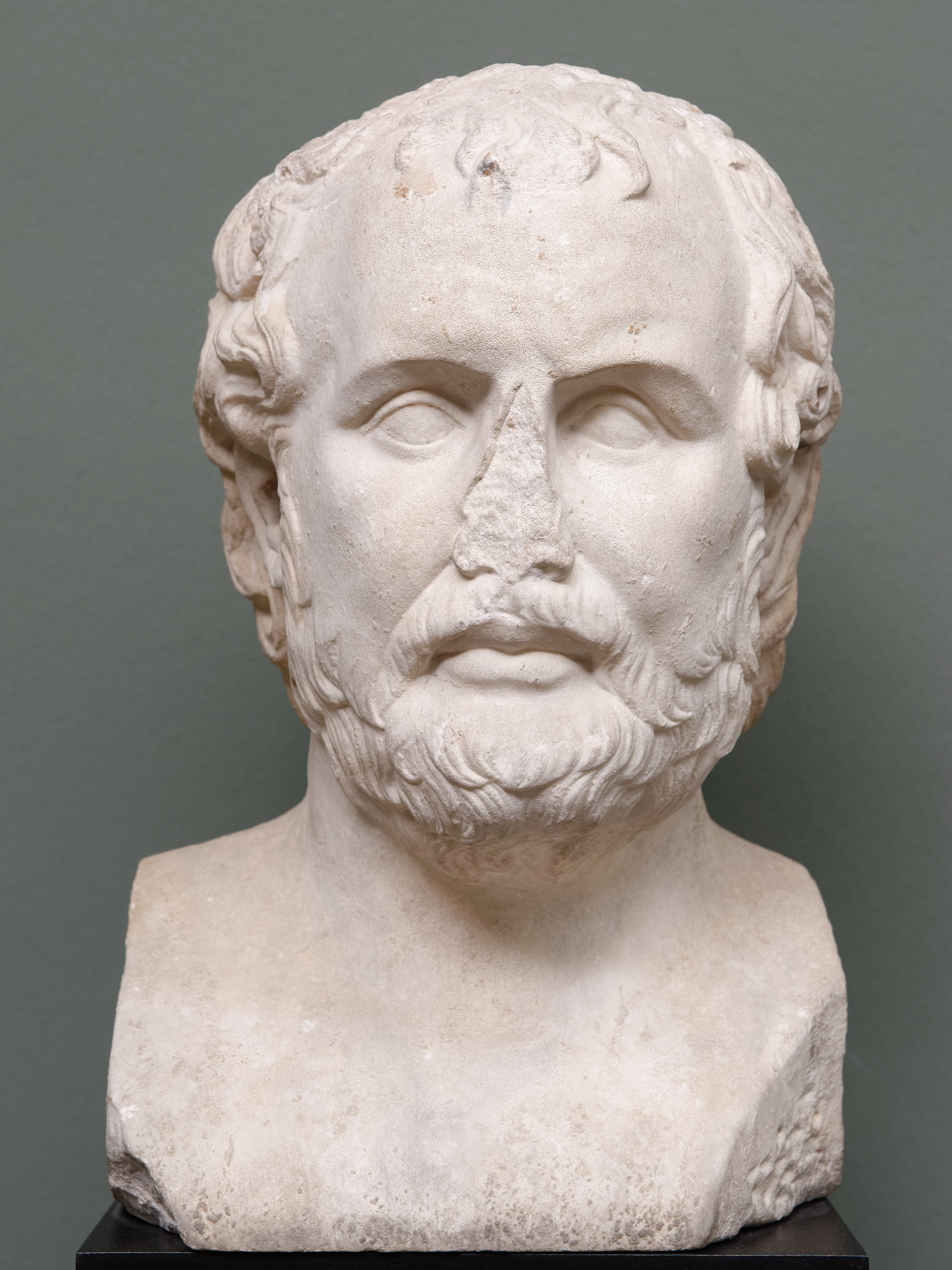
Bust of Philip II of Macedon, who was instrumental in ending the Third Sacred War

After agreeing to the peace terms with Macedonian ambassadors in April, the Athenians dispatched a second embassy to Macedon, to extract the peace oaths from Philip; this embassy travelled to Pella at a relaxed pace, knowing that Philip was away on campaign against the Thracian king Kersebleptes. When they arrived, the Athenians (again including Demosthenes and Aeschines) were rather surprised to find embassies from all the principal combatants in the Sacred War were also present, in order to discuss a settlement to the war.

When Philip returned from Thrace he received both the Athenian and other embassies. The Thebans and Thessalians requested that he take the leadership of Greece, and punish Phocis; conversely, the Phocians, supported by the Spartans and the Athenian delegations, pleaded with Philip not to attack Phocis. Philip, however, delayed making any decisions; "[he] sought by every means not to reveal how he intended to settle things; both sides were privately encouraged to hope that he would do as they wanted, but both were bidden not to prepare for war; a peacefully arranged concordat was at hand"; he also delayed taking the oaths to the Peace of Philocrates. Military preparations were ongoing in Pella during this period, but Philip told the ambassadors that they were for a campaign against Halus, a small Thessalian city which held out against him. He departed for Halus before making any pronouncements, compelling the Athenian embassy to travel with him; only when they reached Pherae did Philip finally take the oaths, enabling the Athenian ambassadors to return home.

=== Occupation of Thermopylae ===
It was in the aftermath of finally ratifying the Peace that Philip applied the coup de grâce. He had persuaded the Athenians and other Greeks that he and his army was heading for Halus, but it seems certain that he also sent other units straight to Thermopylae. Thus, when he swore oaths to the Athenian assembly in Pherae, his troops were already very close to Thermopylae; by the time the Athenian ambassadors arrived home (9 July), Philip was already in possession of the pass. By delaying the oaths, and making what was effectively a feint against Halus, he prevented the Athenians from seeing their imminent danger, and from having time to garrison the Thermopylae.

=== Peace settlement ===
All of central and southern Greece was now at Philip's mercy, and the Athenians could not now save Phocis even if they abandoned the peace. However, the Athenians were still ignorant of this turn of events when Phocian ambassadors came to Athens to plead for military aid around 9 July. The Athenian council recommended that the peace be rejected, and Thermopylae be occupied in order to help save Phocis; since, as far at the Athenian embassy knew, Philip's troops were still in Pherae, there seemed to be ample time to occupy the pass. By 12 July the news that Philip was "in the gates" arrived in Athens; the Athenians then knew that the situation was hopeless, and instead of acting on the previous recommendation of the council, the Assembly instead passed a motion re-affirming the Peace of Philocrates.

Now that he was in control of Thermopylae, Philip could be certain of dictating the terms of the end of the Sacred War, since he could now use force against any state that did not accept his arbitration. He began by making a truce with Phalaikos on 19 July; Phalaikos surrendered Phocis to him, in return for being allowed to leave with his mercenaries and go wherever he wished. Cawkwell suggests that Phalaikos probably collaborated with Philip in 346 BC, allowing Philip to take Thermopylae in return for lenience for him and his men. Otherwise, it is difficult to see how Philip could have advertised his campaign so far in advance (and been so confident of success), and yet not been stopped at Thermopylae. Philip restored to Boeotia the cities that Phocis had captured during the war (Orchomenos, Coroneia and Corsiae), and then declared that the fate of Phocis would not be decided by him, but by the Amphictyonic Council. This caused great panic in Athens, since the Phocians could never hope for mercy from the Amphictyons, and since Athens had also (having allied with Phocis) shared in the same sacrilege. However, it is clear that Philip was dictating the terms behind the scenes; allowing the Amphictyons the formal responsibility allowed him to dissociate himself from the terms in the future.

In return for ending the war, Macedon was made a member of the Amphictyonic council, and given the two votes which had been stripped from Phocis. This was an important moment for Philip, since membership of the Ampictyony meant that Macedon was now no longer a 'barbarian' state in Greek eyes. The terms imposed on Phocis were harsh, but realistically Philip had no choice but to impose such sanctions; he needed the support of the Thessalians (sworn enemies of Phocis), and could not risk losing the prestige that he had won for his pious conduct during the war. However, they were not as harsh as some of the Amphictyonic members had suggested; the Oeteans had demanded that the traditional punishment for temple robbers of being pushed over a cliff be carried out. Aside from being expelled from the Amphictyonic council, all the Phocian cities were to be destroyed, and the Phocians settled in 'villages' of no more than fifty houses; the money stolen from the temple was to be paid back at a rate of 60 talents per year; He did not, however, destroy the Phocians, and they retained their land. The Athenians, having made peace with Philip, were not penalised by the Amphictyonic council, and the Spartans also seem to have escaped lightly. Philip presided over the Amphictyonic festival in the autumn, and then much to the surprise of the Greeks, he went back to Macedon and did not return to Greece for seven years. He did however retain his access, by garrisoning Nicaea, the closest town to Thermopylae, with Thessalian troops.

== Aftermath ==
The destruction of the Phocian cities and the heavy fine imposed on the Phocian confederation certainly caused the Phocians to bear a grudge against Philip II. Seven years later the Locrians brought charges against the Athenians in the amphictyonic council and a special session of the council was set in order to deal with that matter. The Athenians, however, did not send envoys and neither did the Thebans. This was a clear insult to the council and Philip II intervened once more as a regulator. The Fourth Sacred War broke out, ending in the total subjugation of Greece to the kingdom of Macedonia. The Phocians recovered gradually from the repercussions of the Third Sacred War and managed to be reinstated in the Amphictyony in 279 BC, when they joined forces with the Aetolian League fighting against the Gauls. However, a serious side-loss of the Third Sacred War remained the destruction of a large number of ex votos and other precious offerings to the sanctuary of Apollo, which deprived not only the sanctuary itself but also the later generations of some magnificent pieces of art.

== Bibliography ==
=== Ancient sources ===
- Aeschines, Speeches
- Diodorus Siculus, Bibliotheca historica
- Justin, Epitome of Pompeius Trogus's Philippic History
- Polyaenus, Stratagems in War

=== Modern sources ===
- Buckler, John (1989). Philip II and the Sacred War. Brill Archive. ISBN 90-04-09095-9.
- Buckley, Terry (1996). Aspects of Greek history, 750–323 BC: a source-based approach. Routledge. ISBN 0-415-09957-9.
- Cawkwell, George (1978). Philip II of Macedon. Faber & Faber. ISBN 0-571-10958-6.
- Green, Peter (2008). Alexander the Great and the Hellenistic Age. Phoenix. ISBN 978-0-7538-2413-9.
- Green, Peter (2006). Diodorus Siculus – Greek history 480–431 BC: the alternative version (translated by Peter Green). University of Texas Press. ISBN 0-292-71277-4.
- Hornblower, Simon (2002). The Greek world, 479–323 BC. Routledge. ISBN 0-415-16326-9.
- Sealey, Raphael (1976). A history of the Greek city states, ca. 700–338 B.C.. University of California Press. ISBN 0-520-03177-6.
- Worthington, Ian (2008). Philip II of Macedonia. Yale University Press. ISBN 978-0-300-12079-0.
