= Neochori, Magnesia =

Neochori Νεοχώρι
- Community
- Location within Greece
- Coordinates: 39°18′N 23°13′E
- Country: Greece
- Administrative region: Thessaly
- Regional unit: Magnesia
- Municipality: South Pelion
- Municipal unit: Afetes

Population (2021)
  - Community: 580
- Time zone: UTC+2 (EET)
  - Summer (DST): UTC+3 (EEST)
- Vehicle registration: ΒΟ

Neochori (Greek: Νεοχώρι) is a village and a community situated on the peninsula of Pelion, Magnesia, eastern Thessaly, Greece. It was the seat of the former municipality Afetes. The village is hidden in the embrace of a vast pine forest 480 meters above sea level, and about 35 km southeast of the city of Volos. The community Neochori consists of the villages Neochori, Agios Dimitrios, Afyssos, Zervochia, Megali Vrysi and Plaka. The community stretches from the Aegean Sea coast of the Pelion peninsula to the Pagasetic Gulf. Agios Dimitrios and Plaka are on the Aegean coast, and the tourist centre Afyssos is on the Pagasetic coast.

A village square is situated in the centre of Neochori, adorned by the centuries-old plane trees and a roofed fountain dating from 1807. There are two tavernas and also a small kafenion. The Agios Dimitrios church below the square was constructed in 1768 and is truly remarkable. Externally, the church looks pretty simple, but the inside impresses with its wooden carved icon screen and the wall paintings by the Epirote painter Pagonis.

Neochori is famous for the slate of its quarries. Furthermore honey, apples and olives are typical products of Neochori and its vicinity.

== Population ==
Year	Village population	Community population
1981	-	911
1991	341	-
2001	386	789
2011	356	735
2021	302	580

== History ==
Neochori is, like the name says, a "new" village, (neo chori = new place). In former times, the region was settled completely from the Aegean side up to the Pagasitikos Gulf. Neohori however was built in the Middle Ages by inhabitants of the surrounding settlements as well as by settlers from the Aegean side and from the north of Greece.

The history of the region around Neochori is very long. It started in the ancient world; we know about the myths of Afetai, the myths of the kingdom of Lai and reports talking about Minoan settlements, as well as settlers at Agios Dimitrios and Cape Klossou, which is named in many old maps as "Knossou". The historians Strabo and Herodotus wrote reports about Afetai.

== See also ==
- List of settlements in the Magnesia regional unit
