= Chorto =

Chorto Χόρτο
- Settlement
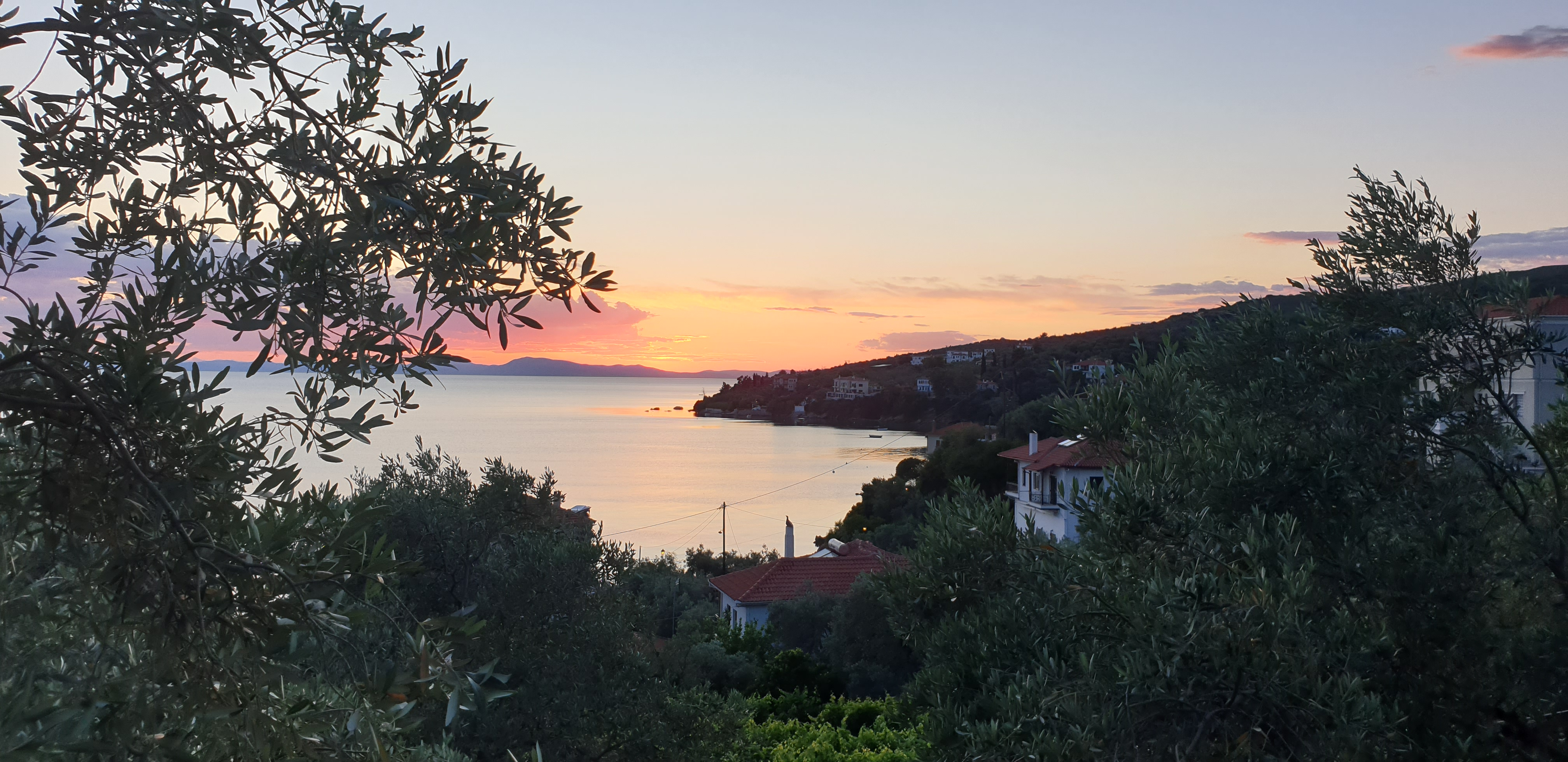
- Chorto sunset captured from mountain pathway

- Location within Greece
- Coordinates: 39°12′N 23°13′E
- Country: Greece
- Administrative region: Thessaly
- Regional unit: Magnesia
- Municipality: South Pelion
- Municipal unit: Argalasti
- Community: Argalasti

Population (2021)
  - Total: 85
- Time zone: UTC+2 (EET)
  - Summer (DST): UTC+3 (EEST)
- Vehicle registration: ΒΟ

Chorto (Greek: Χόρτο) is a seaside village is the municipal unit of Argalasti in Magnesia, Greece. Chorto is located by the Pagasetic Gulf, 4 km south of Argalasti.

The ancient city of Spalathra was situated near Chorto, most likely on the Chortokastron hill. There are archaeological remains of early Christian churches in the village, and of a Byzantine-era church and fortress on Chortokastron.

Located in the centre of Chorto is the museum Aggelini, which has a great range of old books, traditional objects of everyday use and many valuable relics. There are many hiking trails known as Kalderimi in the South Pelion area, which is a network of stone paths dating back a few hundred years. Chorto is also known for its two theatres, indoor and outdoor, which hosts musicians from all over the world.

== Population ==
Year	Population
1991	130
2001	133
2011	147
2021	85

== See also ==
- List of settlements in the Magnesia regional unit
