= Nicaea (Locris) =

Coordinates: 38°48′17″N 22°35′50″E

Nicaea or Nikaia (Ancient Greek: Νίκαια), was an ancient fortress of the Epicnemidian Locrians, situated upon the sea, and close to the pass of Thermopylae. It is described by Aeschines as one of the places which commanded the pass. It was the first Locrian town after Alpenos, the latter being at the very entrance of the pass. The surrender of Nicaea by Phalaecus to Philip II, in 346 BCE, made the Macedonian king master of Thermopylae, and brought the Third Sacred War to an end. Philip kept possession of it for some time, but subsequently gave it to the Thessalians along with Magnesia. But in 340 BC we again find Nicaea in the possession of Philip. According to Memnon of Heraclea, Nicaea was destroyed by the Phocians, and its inhabitants founded Bithynian Nicaea. But even if this is true, the town must have been rebuilt soon afterwards, since we find it in the hands of the Aetolians during the Roman wars in Greece. Subsequently the town is only mentioned by Strabo (ix. p. 426). William Martin Leake identifies Nicaea with the castle of Mendenitsa, where there are ancient remains.

Modern scholars place its site at Ag. Triada / Palaiokastro.

== Notes ==
10. Livy, "The Dawn of the Roman Empire", (Oxford World's Classics, 2000, Books 31-40) Book 32, chapt 32, p 86, "They [Phillip II of Macedonia and Roman Consul, Quinctius] chose a site on a beach in the Malian Gulf near Nicaea..." in 197 BC.
