= Afetes =

Afetes Αφέτες
- Municipal unit
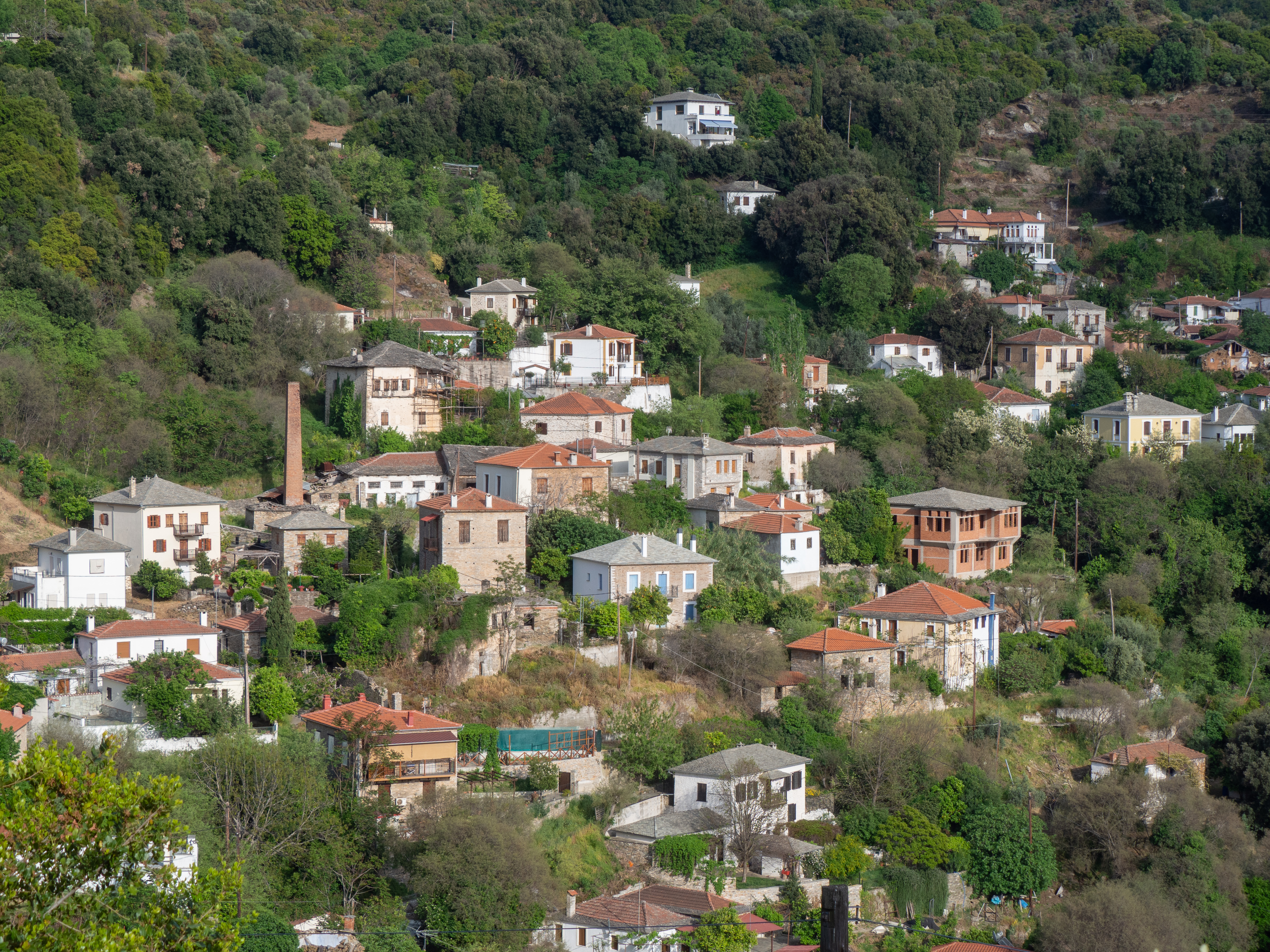

- Location within the regional unit

- Location within Greece
- Coordinates: 39°17′N 23°11′E
- Country: Greece
- Administrative region: Thessaly
- Regional unit: Magnesia
- Municipality: South Pelion

Area
  - Municipal unit: 80.7 km^{2} (31.2 sq mi)
- Highest elevation: 800 m (2,600 ft)
- Lowest elevation: 0 m (0 ft)

Population (2021)
  - Municipal unit: 1,255
  - Municipal unit density: 15.6/km^{2} (40.3/sq mi)
  - Community: 221
- Time zone: UTC+2 (EET)
  - Summer (DST): UTC+3 (EEST)
- Postal code: 370 10
- Area code: 24230
- Vehicle registration: ΒΟ

Afetes (Greek: Αφέτες) is a village and a former municipality in Magnesia, Thessaly, Greece. Since the 2011 local government reform it is part of the municipality South Pelion, of which it is a municipal unit. The municipal unit has an area of 80.744 km^{2}. The seat of the municipality was in Neochori. Afetes is situated in the Pelion peninsula, 2 km from the Pagasetic Gulf coast, 4 km southwest of Neochori, 6 km northwest of Argalasti and 23 km southeast of Volos.

The name Afetes was taken from the ancient port Aphetae. The Persian fleet occupied the bay of Aphetae before the Battle of Artemisium, in 480 BC.

== Subdivisions ==
The municipal unit Afetes is subdivided into the following communities (constituent villages in brackets):

- Afetes (Afetes, Profitis Ilias)
- Kalamaki
- Lampinou
- Neochori (Neochori, Agios Dimitrios, Afyssos, Zervochia, Megali Vrysi, Plaka)
- Syki

== Population ==
Year	Municipal unit population	Community population
1991	2,091	-
2001	1,838	252
2011	1,746	341
2021	1,255	221

== See also ==
- List of settlements in the Magnesia regional unit
