= Battle of Crocus Field =

353/52 BC Macedonian victory in Greece

- Part of the Third Sacred War and Rise of Macedon
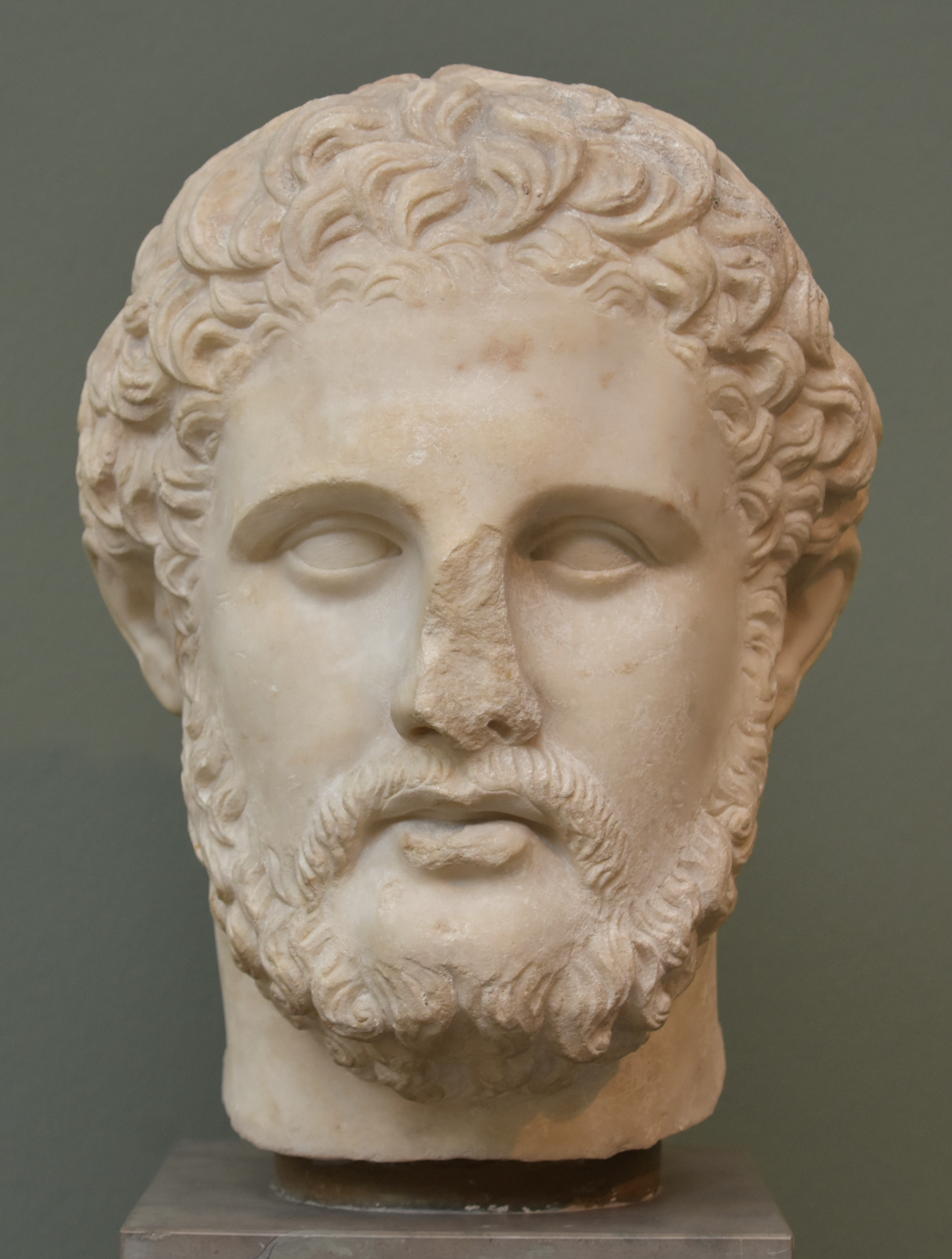
- Bust of Philip II of Macedon, whose army was victorious in the battle.
Date	353 or 352 BC
Location	Thessaly, Greece
Result	Macedonian victory

Belligerents
Macedon; Thessalian Confederation	Phocis; Athens

Commanders and leaders
Philip II of Macedon	Onomarchos †; Chares

Strength
20,000 foot; 3,000 horse	20,000 foot; 500 horse

Casualties and losses
Unknown	up to 9,000 dead

The Battle of Crocus Field (Krokion pedion) (353 BC or 352 BC) was a battle in the Third Sacred War, fought between the armies of Phocis, under Onomarchos, and the combined Thessalian and Macedonian army under Philip II of Macedon. The Phocians were decisively defeated by Philip's forces. Philip's victory secured his appointment as ruler of Thessaly, marking an important step in the rise of Macedon to political ascendancy in Ancient Greece. Opinion amongst historians is divided as to the year of the battle; some favour 353 BC, and others 352 BC.

== Sources and chronology ==
The ancient sources for the Third Sacred War are scant, and generally lacking in firm chronological information. The main source for the period is Diodorus Siculus's Bibliotheca historica, written in the 1st century BC, which is therefore very much a secondary source. Diodorus is often derided by modern historians for his style and inaccuracies, but he preserves many details of the ancient period found nowhere else. Diodorus worked primarily by epitomizing the works of other historians, omitting many details where they did not suit his purpose, which was to illustrate moral lessons from history; his account of the Third Sacred War therefore contains many gaps.

Beyond Diodorus, further details of the Sacred War can be found in the orations of Athenian statesmen, primarily Demosthenes and Aeschines, which have survived intact. Since these speeches were never intended to be historical material, they must be treated with circumspection; Demosthenes and Aeschines have been described as "a couple of liars, neither of whom can be trusted to have told the truth in any matter in which it was remotely in his interest to lie". Nevertheless, their allusions to contemporary or past events indicates some of the gaps in Diodorus's account, and helps with the arrangement of the chronology. The accounts of Diodorus, Demosthenes and Aeschines can be further supplemented by fragments of otherwise lost histories (such as that by Theopompus) and by contemporary epigraphic sources.

Modern historians' dates for the war have been hotly debated, and there is no clear consensus. It is generally accepted that the war lasted 10 years, and ended in summer 346 BC (one of the only firm dates), which yields a date of 356 BC for the beginning of the war, with Philomelos's seizure of Delphi. After Philomelos's defeat at Neon, the Thebans thought it safe to send the general Pammenes to Asia with 5,000 hoplites. A combination of evidence suggests that Pammenes met with Philip at Maroneia in Thrace, in 355 BC, presumably on his outward journey to Asia. Buckler, the only historian to produce a systematic study of the sacred war, therefore places Neon earlier in 355 BC. Other historians have placed Neon in 354 BC, since Diodorus says that the battle took place while Philip besieged Methone, which Diodorus (at one point) places in 354 BC. However, Diodorus's chronology for the sacred war is very confused – he dates the start and end of the war a year too late, variously says the war lasted 9, 10 or 11 years, and included the siege of Methone twice under different dates – and his dates cannot therefore be relied upon.

Disregarding the dates, most historians agree upon the same sequence of events for this part of the Sacred War. The principal question is therefore when that sequence started. Thus, Buckler (as well as Beloch and Cloche) dates Neon to 355 BC, Methone to 355–354 BC, Philip's first Thessalian campaign to 354 BC, and his second to 353 BC. Conversely, Cawkwell, Sealey, Hammond and others lower all these dates by one year, beginning with Neon in 354 BC.

== Background ==
The Third Sacred War (often just called 'the' Sacred War) broke out in 356 BC, and would present Philip with his first real opportunity to expand his influence into the affairs of central and southern Greece. The war was caused by the refusal of the Phocian Confederation to pay a fine imposed on them in 357 BC by the Amphictyonic League, a pan-Greek religious organisation which governed the most sacred site in Ancient Greece, the Temple of Apollo at Delphi. Behind the religious element, there probably lay a display of realpolitik in bringing charges against the Phocians, instigated by the Thebans. At this time, Thebes controlled a majority of the votes in the council, and at the autumn meeting in 357 BC, the Thebans were able to have both the Phocians (for the cultivation of the sacred land) and the Spartans (for occupying Thebes some 25 years previously) denounced and fined. Since the fines for both parties were "unjustifiably harsh", the Thebans probably expected neither party to pay, and thus to be able to declare a "sacred war" on either.

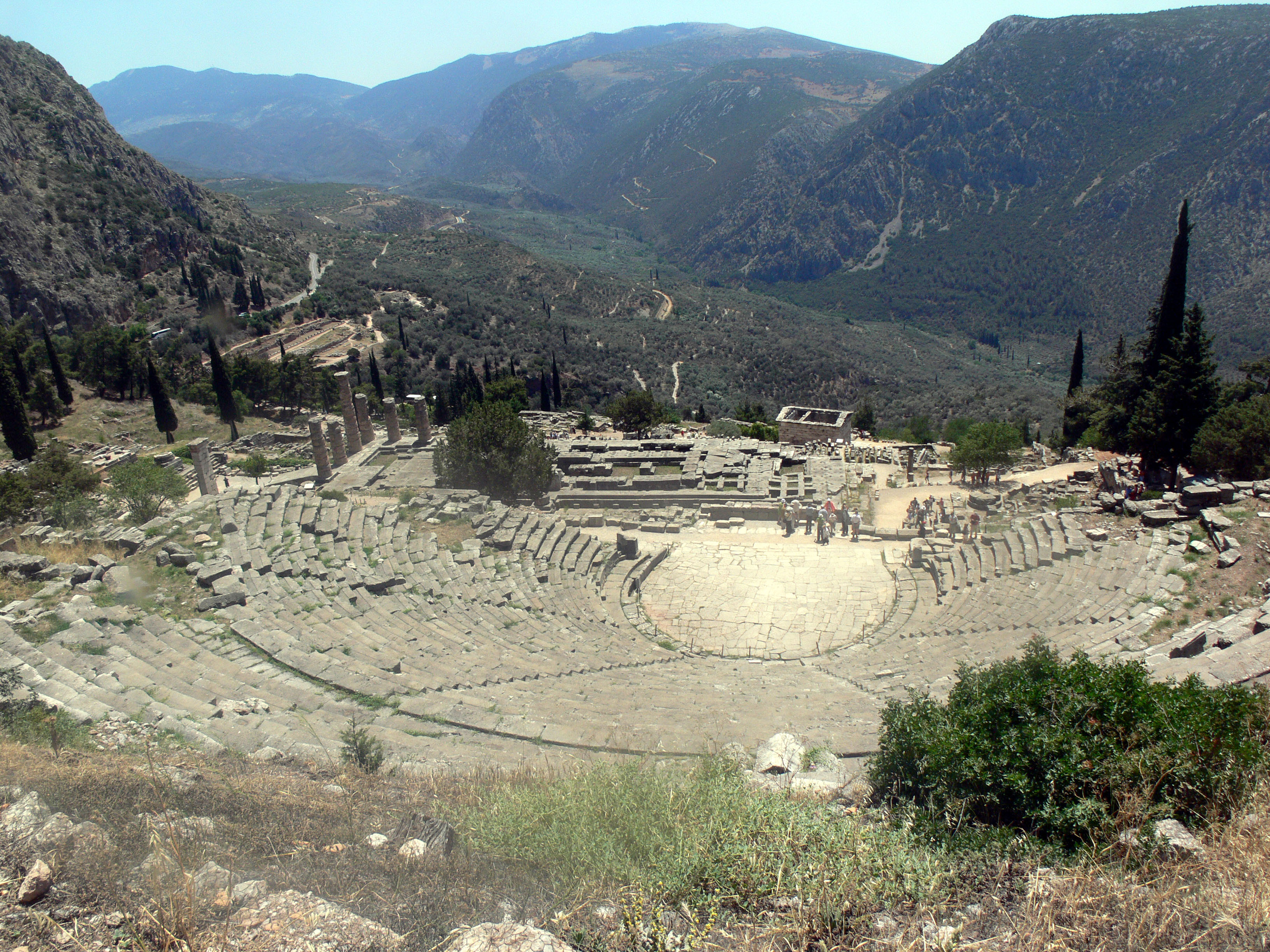
The ruins of ancient Delphi

In response, the Phocians, under the leadership of Philomelos, seized Delphi (which was situated within the boundaries of Phocis), and asserted the ancient claim of Phocis to the presidency of the Amphictyonic League, intending to annul the judgment against themselves. There seems to have been some sympathy in Greece for the Phocians, since other states could see that "the Thebans ... had used the Amphictyony to pursue petty and destructive vendettas". The Phocians were supported by Athens (perennial enemies of Thebes) and unsurprisingly Sparta, who hoped to see their own fine wiped out when the Phocians seized Delphi. However, Philomelos plundered the treasury of Apollo to pay for mercenaries, thus raising a powerful army, but drastically altering the opinion of the other Greek states. In winter 356/355 BC, a "sacred war" was declared against the Phocians by the Amphictyonic council, with the Thebans being the major protagonists. The war started relatively well for the Phocians, but a severe defeat was inflicted on the Phocians at Neon by the Thebans in either 355 or 354 BC and Philomelos was killed. Undeterred, Onomarchos took over the Phocian effort, and raised new mercenaries to carry on the fight.

The Sacred War appears to have paved the way for renewed conflict within Thessaly. The Thessalian Confederation were in general staunch supporters of the Amphictyonic League, and had an ancient hatred of the Phocians. Conversely, the-city state of Pherae had allied itself with the Phocians. In either 354 or 353 BC, the nobility of the Thessalian city of Larissa appealed to Philip to help them defeat the Pheraeans. Philip thus brought an army into Thessaly, probably with the intention of attacking Pherae. Under the terms of their alliance, Lycophron of Pherae requested aid from the Phocians, and Onomarchos dispatched his brother, Phayllos, with 7,000 men; however, Philip repulsed this force before it could join up with the Pheraeans. Onomarchos then abandoned the siege he was prosecuting, and brought his whole force into Thessaly to attack Philip. The exact details of the campaign that followed are unclear, but Onomarchos seems to have inflicted two defeats on Philip, with many Macedonians killed in the process. After these defeats, Philip retreated to Macedon for the winter. He is said to have commented that he "did not run away but, like a ram, I pulled back to butt again harder".

Philip returned to Thessaly the next summer (either 353 or 352 BC, depending on the chronology followed), having gathered a new army in Macedon. Philip formally requested that the Thessalians join him in the war against the Phocians. Philip now mustered all the Thessalian opponents of Pherae that he could, and according to Diodorus, his final army numbered 20,000 infantry and 3,000 cavalry.

== Prelude ==
Both Buckler and Cawkwell suggest that Philip besieged the strategic port of Pagasae (effectively the harbour of Pherae) before the Battle of Crocus Field. By taking Pagasae, it is probable that Philip intended to prevent it being reinforced by sea; Buckler suggests that Philip had learnt his lesson from the previous campaign, and wanted to cut Pherae off from outside help before attacking it. Meanwhile, Onomarchos returned to Thessaly to try to preserve the Phocian ascendancy there, with approximately the same force as during the previous year. Furthermore, the Athenians dispatched Chares with a substantial fleet to help their Phocian allies, seeing the opportunity to strike a decisive blow against Philip. The Phocians and Athenians probably intended to rendezvous at Pagasae, since it was the only harbour the Athenian fleet could use, and since Philip was there anyway.

== Battle ==
Subsequent events are unclear, but a battle was fought between the Macedonians and the Phocians, probably as Philip tried to prevent the Phocians joining forces with the Pheraeans, and crucially, before the Athenians had arrived. No ancient source names the battlefield, but according to Diodorus the two armies met near the sea. The Krokion/Krokoton Pedion or 'Crocus Plain' (around modern Almyros in Magnesia, Thessaly region) seems the most suitable location, and the battle is therefore known to modern scholars as the Battle of Crocus Field; however, firmly identifying the battle-site has proved impossible.

Philip sent his men into battle wearing crowns of laurel, the symbol of Apollo, "as if he was the avenger ... of sacrilege, and he proceeded to battle under the leadership, as it were, of the god". Some of the Phocian mercenaries supposedly threw down their arms, troubled by their guilty consciences. In the ensuing battle, the bloodiest recorded in ancient Greek history, Philip won a decisive victory over the Phocians. The battle seems to have been won by superior numbers and by the valour of Philip's cavalry.

Fleeing from defeat, the Phocians ran to the sea, where Chares' fleet had arrived during the battle, but many men were killed during the pursuit, or drowned as they tried to reach the ships. In total, 6,000 Phocian troops had been killed, including Onomarchos, and another 3,000 taken prisoner. Onomarchos was either hanged or crucified and the other prisoners drowned, as ritual demanded for temple-robbers. These punishments were designed to deny the defeated an honourable burial; Philip thus continued to present himself as the pious avenger of the sacrilege committed by the Phocians. Buckler states that: "Nor should one automatically assume that a mass-drowning ... would shock the Greek world. Even the mild-tempered Isocrates felt that the Phocian mercenaries were better off dead than alive...Dreadful indeed was the punishment, but it was entirely consistent with Philip's role as Apollo's champion".

== Aftermath ==
It was probably in the aftermath of his victory (if not before) that the Thessalians appointed Philip archon of Thessaly. This was an appointment for life, and gave Philip control over all the revenues of the Thessalian Confederation, and furthermore made Philip leader of the united Thessalian army. The tyrants of Pherae, rather than suffer the fate of Onomarchos, struck a bargain with Philip and, in return for handing Pherae over to Philip, were allowed, along with 2,000 of their mercenaries, to go to Phocis. Philip spent some time reorganising Thessaly, and once satisfied he marched south to the pass of Thermopylae, the gateway to central Greece. He probably intended to follow up his victory over the Phocians by invading Phocis itself, a prospect which greatly alarmed the Athenians, since once he was past Thermopylae he could also march on Athens. The Athenians therefore dispatched a force to Thermopylae and occupied the pass; there is some debate as to whether other contingents may have joined the Athenians at Thermopylae. Although it might have proved possible to force the pass, Philip did not attempt to do so, preferring not to risk a defeat after his great successes in Thessaly.

Meanwhile, the Phocians regrouped under Onomarchos's brother, Phayllos. After the huge Phocian defeats at Neon and Crocus Field, Phayllos had to resort to doubling the pay for mercenaries, in order to attract enough to replenish his army. Despite their defeats however, the majority of the Phocians were still in favour of continuing the war. Over the winter of that year, Phayllos engaged in diplomatic efforts to gather more support from Phocian allies, and succeeding in widening the theatre of conflict in the next campaigning season. Uniquely in Greek history, the Phocians were able to absorb huge losses in manpower, thanks to their pillaging of Temple of Apollo, a factor which was to contribute to the war dragging on indecisively until 346 BC.

== Bibliography ==
=== Ancient sources ===
- Diodorus Siculus – Bibliotheca historica
- Justin – Epitome of Pompeius Trogus's Philippic History

=== Modern sources ===
- Buckler, John (1989). Philip II and the Sacred War. Brill Archive. ISBN 90-04-09095-9.
- Buckley, Terry (1996). Aspects of Greek history, 750-323 BC: a source-based approach. Routledge. ISBN 0-415-09957-9.
- Cawkwell, George (1978). Philip II of Macedon. Faber & Faber. ISBN 0-571-10958-6.
- Green, Peter (2008). Alexander the Great and the Hellenistic Age. Phoenix. ISBN 978-0-7538-2413-9.
- Green, Peter (2006). Diodorus Siculus – Greek history 480–431 BC: the alternative version (translated by Peter Green). University of Texas Press. ISBN 0-292-71277-4.
- Hornblower, Simon (2002). The Greek world, 479-323 BC. Routledge. ISBN 0-415-16326-9.
- Sealey, Raphael (1976). A history of the Greek city states, ca. 700-338 B.C.. University of California Press. ISBN 0-520-03177-6.
