= Paleo Trikeri =

Greek island in the Pagasitic Gulf

Native name: Παλαιό Τρίκερι
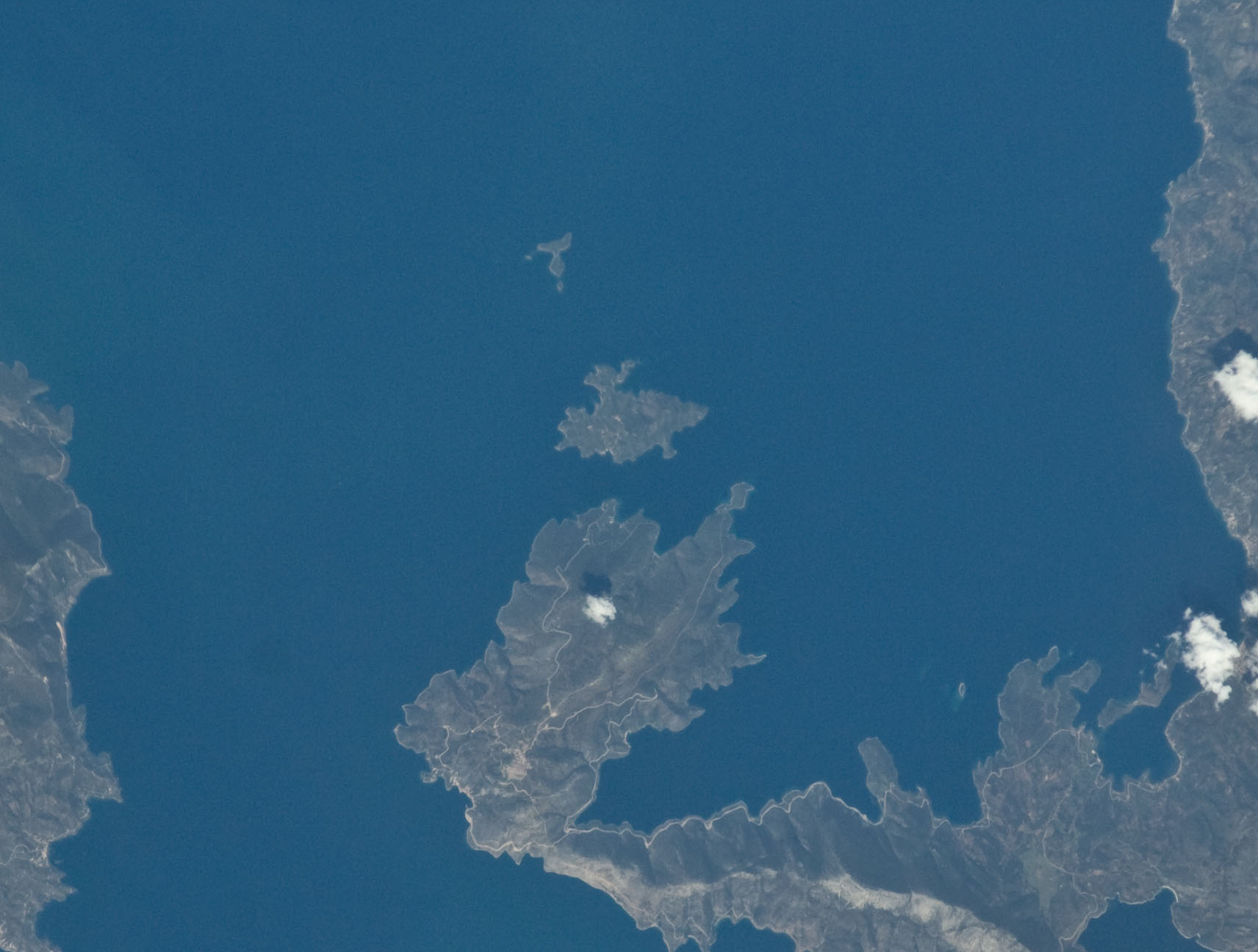
- Paleo Trikeri, north of the tip of the Pelion peninsula
- Interactive map of Paleo Trikeri

Geography
- Coordinates: 39°10′00″N 23°05′00″E
- Adjacent to: Pagasitic Gulf, near Pelion
- Area: 2.5 km^{2} (0.97 sq mi)

Administration
- Greece

Paleo Trikeri (Greek: Παλαιό Τρίκερι) or Old Trikeri, also known as Trikeri Island, is a small island in the Pagasitic Gulf off the end of the Pelion peninsula in Thessaly, Greece. It is part of the municipal unit of Trikeri within the municipality of South Pelion. In the 2001 census it was reported to have a population of 87, but the year-round population has been estimated at 15. The island has an area of about 2.5 square kilometres (0.97 sq mi) There are no cars or roads on the island. In antiquity, the island was called Cicynethus (Ancient Greek: Κικύνηθος, romanized: Kikynethos). Ancient Kikynethos formed as polis (city-state) of Magnesia, ancient Thessaly.

== History ==
In June 1913, at the end of the Second Balkan War, Greek authorities turned the almost uninhabited island into a camp for Bulgarian prisoners of war. An International Commission sponsored by the Carnegie Endowment was sent to inspect the conditions, but the local guards turned it back under the excuse that there was a cholera epidemic.

On 9 October 1913, the Bulgarian ships Varna, Boris and Bulgaria arrived to Old Trikeri to take the prisoners back. Varna and Boris left the next day with a total of 2,462 Bulgarian ex-prisoner soldiers and 43 officers. On 12 October, all three ships arrived to Varna with a total number of 3,440 ex-prisoner soldiers, 40 officers, 14 Bulgarian ex-telegraphists from Thessaloniki and 8 Bulgarian ex-railway workers.

On 15 October, Bulgarian newspapers "Пряпорец" and "Воля" wrote that, with the first group liberated from Greece, there were 3,281–3,388 soldiers and lower officers and 64 officers. Most likely, some died during the journey from Greece to Bulgaria. On 18 November 1913 there came another group of 1,347 prisoners, including 3 officers.

Officially, there were 5,330 Bulgarian war prisoners during the Second Balkan War in Greece, many of them located in other parts of Greece, and some arrested komitadjis, whose number is unknown. According to Greek reports from September 1913, there also were 870 Bulgarian civilians – meaning komitadjis. At the same time, Bulgaria was seeking 4,910 war prisoners from Greece. In 1914, according to Greek statistics, there were a total of 7,000 Bulgarian prisoners on Old Trikeri. According to the Bulgarian list of Bulgarian prisoners, 254 Bulgarian prisoners were lost, while according to the Greek list of Bulgarian prisoners, 297 Bulgarian prisoners were lost. Some of these men were probably lost at Old Trikeri.

Starting in 1946, the island was used as a concentration camp. The first to arrive after a decision by the Minister for National Security, Napoleon Zervas, were male communist political prisoners. The men were mostly from the districts of Epirus and Thessaly and participated in the EAM-ELAS, a resistance movement during WWII and the occupation period of Greece by Italian, German and Bulgarian military forces. Later in 1947, the men were relocated to other concentration camps and the camp was used for female pro-Communist political prisoners during the Greek Civil War. The women and their children were themselves members of the EAM-ELAS and/or relatives of members of the EAM-ELAS. In September 1949, political activists from other camps were sent to Old Trikeri, increasing the number of people held there to 4,700.
