= Aphetae =

Coordinates: 39°08′27″N 23°16′27″E

Aphetae or Aphetai (Ancient Greek: Ἀφεταί or Ἀφέται) was a port of Magnesia in Ancient Thessaly, said to have derived its name from the departure of the Argonauts from it.

The Persian fleet occupied the bay of Aphetae, previous to the Battle of Artemisium in 480 BCE, from which Aphetae was distant 80 stadia, according to Herodotus.

William Martin Leake identifies Aphetae with the modern harbor of Trikeri, or alternatively with the harbor between the island of Paleo Trikeri and the mainland. Modern scholars tentatively place the site of Aphetae in a place called Kato Yeoryios near the modern village of Platania (Πλατανιάς). The modern village of Afetes, at some distance to Kato Yeoryios, was renamed to reflect this ancient port.
