= Xinovrysi =

Xinovrysi Ξινόβρυση
- Community
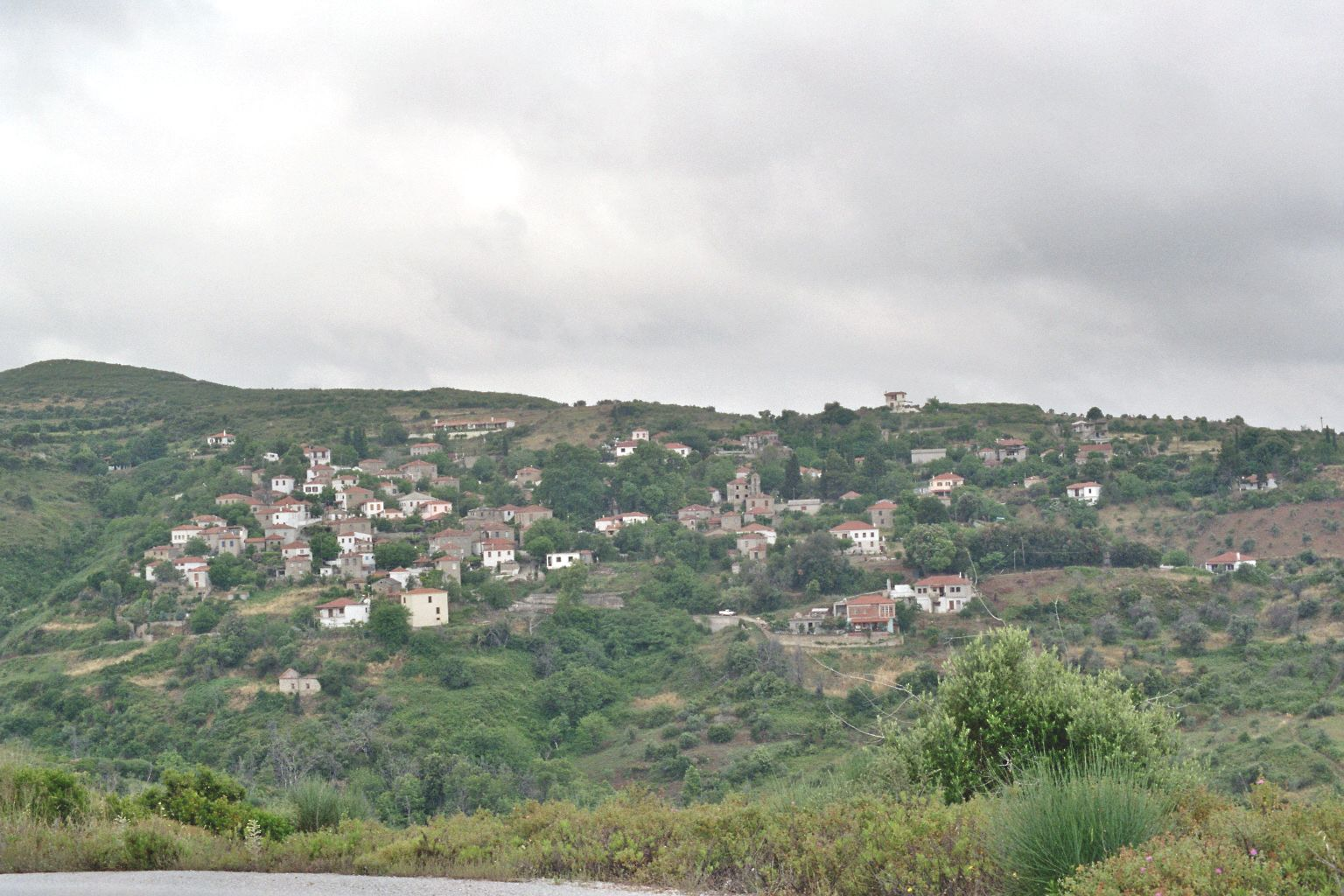

- Location within Greece
- Coordinates: 39°15′N 23°16′E
- Country: Greece
- Administrative region: Thessaly
- Regional unit: Magnesia
- Municipality: South Pelion
- Municipal unit: Argalasti

Population (2021)
  - Community: 144
- Time zone: UTC+2 (EET)
  - Summer (DST): UTC+3 (EEST)
- Vehicle registration: ΒΟ

Xinovrysi (Greek: Ξινόβρυση, before 1927: Μπεστίνικα - Bestinika) is a village in the Pelion area in Magnesia, Greece. It is part of the municipal unit of Argalasti. Xinovrysi is 3.5 km northeast of Argalasti, 7 km north of Promyri and 30 km southeast of Volos. The community includes the village Potistika.

== Population ==
Year	Village population	Community population
mid-19th century	325	-
1881	429	-
1971	276	-
1981	306	-
1991	208	-
2001	161	199
2011	164	213
2021	127	144

== History ==
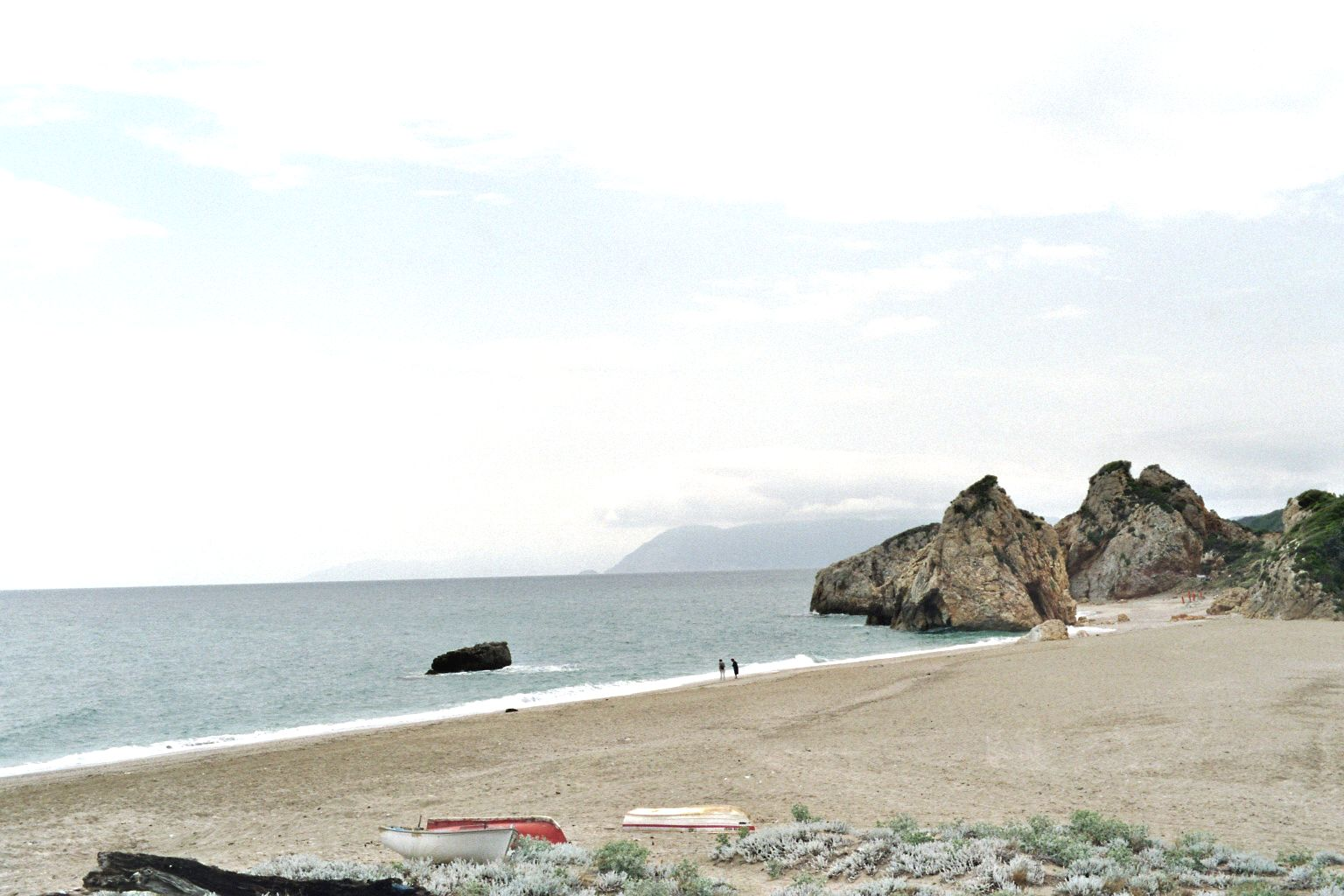
Potistika beach. In the middle of the photo the Skamni rock, and at background the mountains of Skiathos island.

The former name of the town was Bestinika or Bistinika (Μπεστινίκα). The historian Yannis Kordatos describes the origin of the name Bistinika that comes from the Slavic word pestinik or pecnik which means oven. Other think that the origin of the previous name came from the Greek word for narrow, one of its areas are built in a narrow area that are filled with two and three hilltops.

During the Ottoman Period, Bestinika was the mahala of Argalasti. In the mid-19th century, the village had 65 to 80 houses and around 325 inhabitants, cultivating olives, grapes, figs and fruits. The village was not wealthy and it did not have a school. It participated in the revolts against the Ottomans in 1821, 1823, 1854 and 1878. It is said that the Ottomans set fire to the village in the 1823 revolt.

After the liberation of Thessaly in 1881, Bestinika became a part of the municipality of Spalathra, which had its seat in Argalasti. Besides Argalasti and Bestinika the municipality also contained the villages Metochi, Bir [Μπιρ] (now Kallithea) and Ski [Σκι] (now Syki).

In 1914, Bestinika became an independent community and opened a school. In 1927, the name was officially changed to Xinovrysi, after its sour spring. During the difficult wartime periods of World War II and the Greek Civil War, and also after the wars, many of its inhabitants left for larger towns and cities including Volos. Its nearby beaches at the Aegean Sea (Mourtitsa, Potistika, Kourites and Melani) have been attracting tourists. Nevertheless, population kept declining, and the local school closed in the 1990s. In 1998, Xinovrysi became a municipal district of the enlarged municipality of Argalasti.

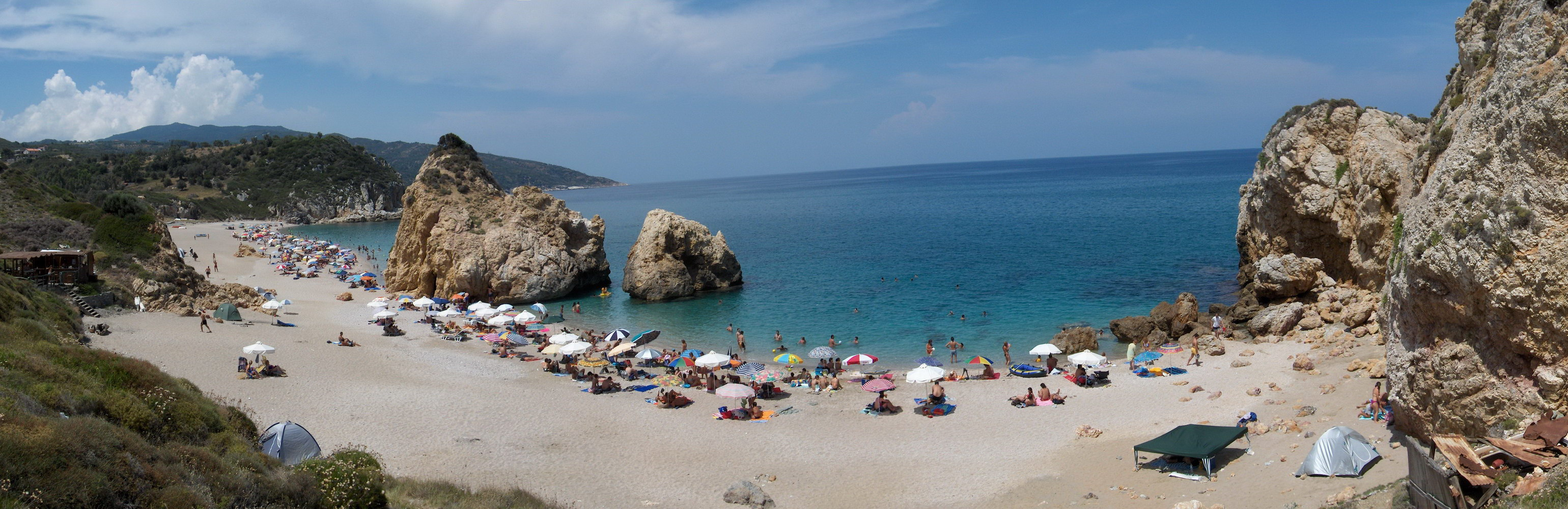
Potistika, one of the four beaches of Xinovrysi.

== See also ==
- List of settlements in the Magnesia regional unit
