= Ledon =

Ancient city of Phocis

Coordinates: 38°40′01″N 22°40′16″E

Ledon (Ancient Greek: Λεδών or Λέδων) was a town of ancient Phocis in Greece, north of Tithorea, the birthplace of Philomelus, the commander of the Phocians in the Third Sacred War. During that war, it was taken by the forces of Philip II of Macedon in 346 BCE. In the time of Pausanias (2nd century) it was abandoned by the inhabitants, who settled upon the Cephissus, at the distance of 40 stadia from the town, but the ruins of the latter were seen by Pausanias.

Its site is tentatively located near Modi, although alternate sites are proposed.
