= Bourboulithra =

Wetland in Magnesia, Greece

Coordinates: 39.35307°N 22.92619°E

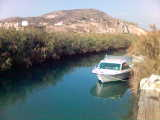
View of the swamp

Bourboulithra (Greek: Μπουρμπουλήθρα) is a 300-acre wetland located in the Neapoli district, west of Volos, Magnesia, Greece that is important for its biological diversity. The main feature of the wetland is its survival in a densely populated urban area and among port facilities, and its significant level of biodiversity, with over 100 species observed by the established watch tower of the Ecological Initiative of Magnesia.

Today as the port expands a new threat rises for the river delta at the northern part of the Pagasetic Gulf affecting its richness in flora and fauna.
