= Lefokastro =

Village in Magnesia, Greece

Coordinates: 39°14′58″N 23°10′55″E

Lefokastro (Greek: Λεφόκαστρον) is a fishing village on the Pagasetic Gulf, 8 kilometres (5 mi) from Argalasti and 34 kilometres (21 mi) from Volos. Lefokastro is part of the community and the municipal unit of Argalasti in Magnesia, Greece.
