= Sipiada =

Sipiada Σηπιάδα
- Municipal unit
- Location within the regional unit

- Location within Greece
- Coordinates: 39°10′N 23°15′E
- Country: Greece
- Administrative region: Thessaly
- Regional unit: Magnesia
- Municipality: South Pelion

Area
  - Municipal unit: 122.4 km^{2} (47.3 sq mi)

Population (2021)
  - Municipal unit: 1,687
  - Municipal unit density: 13.78/km^{2} (35.70/sq mi)
- Time zone: UTC+2 (EET)
  - Summer (DST): UTC+3 (EEST)
- Vehicle registration: ΒΟ

Sipiada (Greek: Σηπιάδα) is a former municipality in Magnesia, Thessaly, Greece, named after the ancient city of "Sepias" or "Sipiada". The Municipality of Sipiada operated according to the Kapodistrias Plan as part of the prefecture of Magnesia from 1999 to 2010, with its headquarters in Lafkos. Since the 2011 local government reform it is part of the municipality of South Pelion, of which it is a municipal unit. The municipal unit has an area of 122.404 km^{2}. Population 1,687 (2021).
