= Delphic =

Delphic may refer to:

- Delphic (band), British band
- Delphic Club, a final club at Harvard College
- Uses as adjective:
  - Of or connected with the city of Delphi, Greece
  - Making of predictions:
    - Delphic ambiguity
    - Of or related to the Delphic Oracle in any way
- British ships:
  - SS Delphic (1897), launched 1897
  - SS Delphic (1925), launched 1918
- The Delphic Fraternity, Inc., also known as Delphic of Gamma Sigma Tau (ΓΣΤ),

== See also ==
- Delphi (disambiguation)
