= Pagasae =

Ancient Greek city

Coordinates: 39°18′47″N 22°55′51″E

Map showing ancient Thessaly. Pagasae is shown to the centre right at the head of its gulf.

Pagasae or Pagases (Greek: Παγασαί, romanized: Pagasaí), also Pagasa, was a town and polis (city-state) of Magnesia in ancient Thessaly, currently a suburb of Volos. It is situated at the northern extremity of the bay named after it (Παγασητικὸς κόλπος, or Latin: Pagasaeus Sinus).

Pagasae is celebrated in mythology as the port where Jason built the ship Argo, and from which he sailed upon his adventurous voyage: hence some of the ancients derived its name from the construction of that vessel, (from πήγνυμι), but others from the numerous and abundant springs which were found at this spot. Apollonius of Rhodes describes the setting vividly in the first book of his Argonautica. Pagasae was conquered by Philip II of Macedon after the defeat of Onomarchus; in Diodorus's report the place is spelt Παγαί - Pagaí. On the foundation of Demetrias in 290 or 293 BCE, Pagasae was one of the towns whose inhabitants were transferred to the new city; but after the Roman conquest Pagasae was restored, and again became an important place. In the time of Strabo it was the port of Pherae, which was the principal city in this part of Thessaly. Pagasae was 90 stadia from Pherae, and 20 from Iolcos.

As of the nineteenth century, the ruins of the ancient city were to be seen near Volos, which has given the modern name to the bay. The acropolis occupied the summit of some rocky heights above Cape Angkístri, and at the foot of the rocks are many copious sources of water, of which Strabo speaks. But as these springs are rather saline to the taste, the city was provided in the Roman times with water from a distance by means of an aqueduct, the ruined piers of which are still a conspicuous object. The accepted site is in the modern village of Nees Pagasees in the municipality of Volos; however, the most recent excavations seem to indicate that Pagasae may be the ruins at nearby Soros, also in the municipality of Volos.

== See also ==
- List of ancient Greek cities
