= Argalasti =

Argalasti Αργαλαστή
- Municipal unit
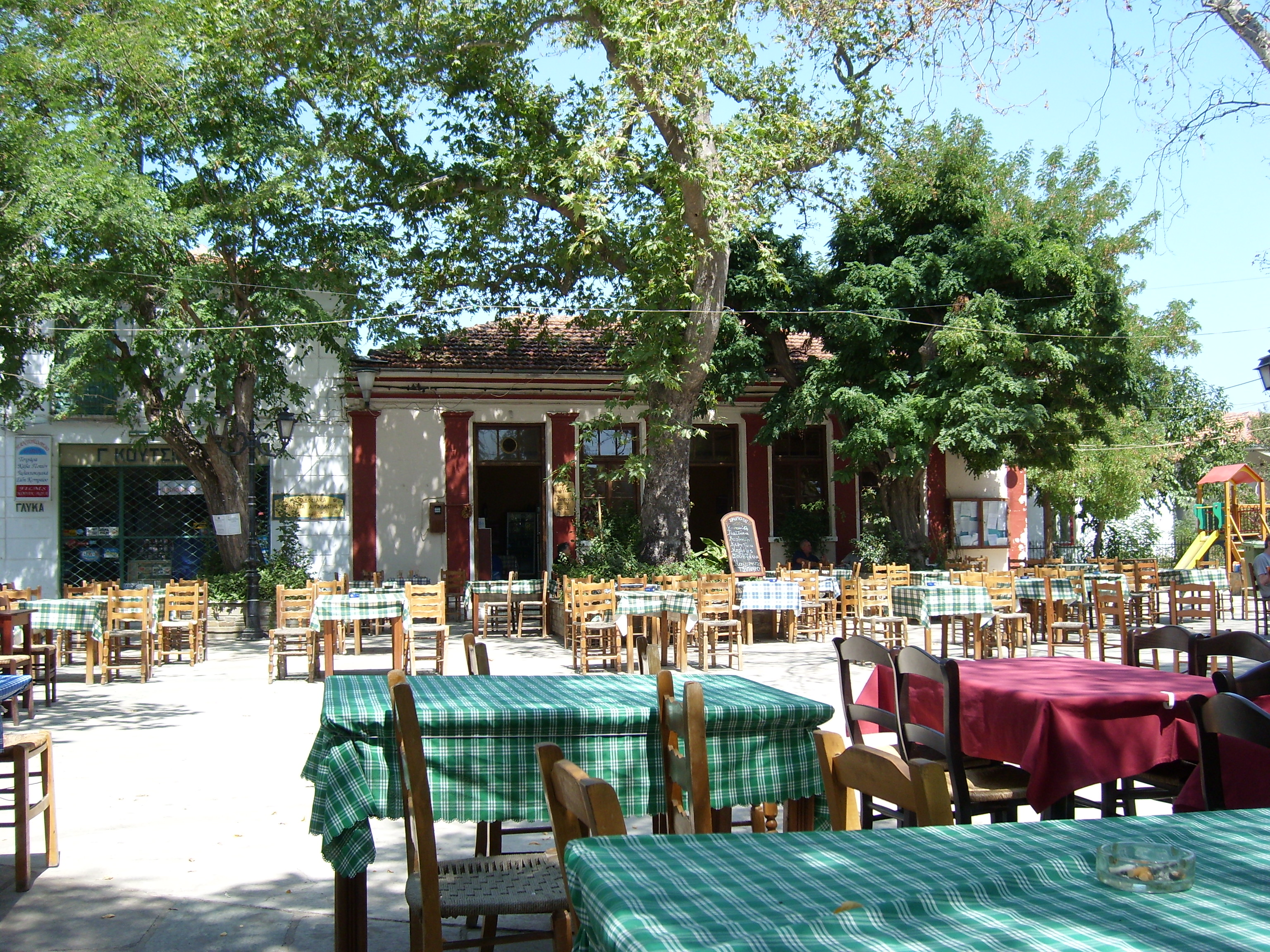
- Argalasti square 2007

- Location within the regional unit

- Location within Greece
- Coordinates: 39°14′N 23°13′E
- Country: Greece
- Administrative region: Thessaly
- Regional unit: Magnesia
- Municipality: South Pelion

Area
  - Municipal unit: 74.8 km^{2} (28.9 sq mi)
- Elevation: 196 m (643 ft)

Population (2021)
  - Municipal unit: 1,603
  - Municipal unit density: 21.4/km^{2} (55.5/sq mi)
  - Community: 1,395
- Time zone: UTC+2 (EET)
  - Summer (DST): UTC+3 (EEST)
- Postal code: 370 06
- Area code: 24230
- Vehicle registration: ΒΟ

Argalasti (Greek: Αργαλαστή) is a village and a former municipality in Magnesia, Thessaly, Greece. Since the 2011 local government reform it is part of the municipality South Pelion, of which it is the seat and a municipal unit. The municipal unit has an area of 74.820 km^{2}. It is built on a fertile plateau, 40 km southeast of Volos. It is an important commercial and tourism center of the area with a rich cultural tradition. Argalasti is a stopping point for those headed for the nearby beaches of the Pagasetic Gulf (Chorto, Kalamos, Lefokastro) or the Aegean Sea (Potistika, Melani, Paltsi, Mikro). An example of the architecture of the beginning of the 20th century is the church tower of Sts. Apostles.

== Subdivisions ==
The municipal unit Argalasti is subdivided into the following communities (constituent villages in brackets):

- Argalasti (Argalasti, Kalamos, Kallithea, Lefokastro, Myriovryti, Paltsi, Paou, Chorto)
- Metochi
- Xinovrysi (Xinovrysi, Potistika)

== History ==
This Pelion town is known for its buildings of architectural interest. Embedded into the walls of several buildings in the village are find pieces of Ancient and Medieval buildings. The monastery of Saint Nicolas provides views of the town. Close to the town square, is the church of Saint Apostles Peter and Paul built in 1886, with a marble bell tower built in 1913.

== Historical population ==
Year	Population community	Population municipal unit
1981	2,016	-
1991	1,393	2,415
2001	1,312	2,148
2011	1,694	1,985
2021	1,395	1,603
