= Philomelus of Phocis =

Phocian general in the Third Sacred War (died 354 BC)

Philomelus of Phocis (Greek: Φιλόμηλος) was general of the Phocians in the Third Sacred War, brother of Onomarchus and son of Theotimus.

== Biography ==
Philomelus, with the help of Sparta, set up as a strategos autokrator a mercenary army and managed to defeat the Locrians. Then he conquered Delphi and fully controlled the local Oracle, forcing Pythia to admit and agree that he could do what he wanted as owner of the Oracle. After that, he stole the treasures of the temple and all the valuable offerings to the god Apollo and used them in order to form additional army corps consisting of 10,000 mercenaries. With the support and help of Sparta, Athens and Corinth, Philomelus again prevailed over the Locrians and Thessalians, but he was defeated in 354 BC by the Boeotians and was killed falling off a cliff.
