= Onomarchus =

4th-century BC Phocian general

Onomarchus (Ancient Greek: Ὀνόμαρχος) was general of the Phocians in the Third Sacred War, brother of Philomelus and son of Theotimus. After his brother's death he became commander of the Phocians and pursued a warmongering policy defeating in battle even Philip II of Macedon until his final defeat by him.

== Commander of the Phocians ==
Onomarchus commanded a division of the Phocian army under his brother, Philomelus, in the action at Tithorea, in which Philomelus perished. After the battle Onomarchus gathered the remains of the Phocian army and retreated to Delphi. An assembly of the people was held, in which Onomarchus strongly urged the prosecution of the war—in opposition to the counsels of the more moderate party.

In the winter of 354/353 BC, the Phocians decided to make Onomarchus supreme commander, in place of Philomelus. As far as the funding of his campaign was concerned, Onomarchus went a step further than his brother and predecessor, who had 'borrowed' from the sacred treasures of Delphi, keeping, however, scrupulous records. He actually confiscated the property of all those states who were opposed to Phocis and made full use of the accumulated wealth of the shrine. Using the treasures of Delphi he was able to assemble and maintain a large body of mercenary troops, in addition to bribing many of the hostile states, allowing him to influence the Thessalians to abandon their allies and take up a neutral position. Thus, disencumbered from his most dangerous antagonists, he was more than a match for his remaining foes.

Onomarchus was also given to presenting handsome young men whom he took as favorites with expensive gifts among those offered to the treasures of Delphi.

== Campaigning ==
Onomarchus' campaigning began in 353 BC. He invaded Locris, took the town of Thronium, compelled Amphissa to surrender, ravaged the Dorian Tetrapolis, and finally turned his arms against Boeotia, where he took Orchomenus and laid siege to Chaeronea, but was compelled to retreat without effecting anything more.

Following the siege of Chaeronea, his assistance was requested by Lycophron, a tyrant of Pherae who was being attacked by Philip II of Macedon. At first Onomarchus sent his brother Phayllus into Thessaly with an army of 7000 men, but they were defeated by Philip's armies. Onomarchus then marched with his entire force to support Lycophron, defeated Philip in two successive battles, and drove him out of Thessaly. Onomarchos probably brought with him 20 000 infantry, 500 cavalry and a large number of catapults , and outnumbered Philip's army. The exact details of the campaign that followed are unclear, but Onomarchos seems to have inflicted two defeats on Philip, with many Macedonians killed in the process. Polyaenus suggests that the first of Onomarchos's victories was aided by the use of the catapults to throw stones into the Macedonian phalanx, as it climbed a slope to attack the Phocians. After these defeats, Philip retreated to Macedon for the winter. He is said to have commented that he "did not run away but, like a ram, I pulled back to butt again harder".

Onomarchus then returned to Boeotia, whose forces he defeated in a battle and took the city of Coroneia. He was recalled once more to the assistance of Lycophron, against Philip, who had again invaded Thessaly. Onomarchus hastened to support his ally with an infantry of 20,000 men and a cavalry of 500 (another source suggests 3000 horse). Philip, however, outnumbered him: a pitched battle ensued, in which the superiority of the Thessalian cavalry decided the victory in favour of Philip.

== Defeat ==
Onomarchus was defeated in the Battle of the Crocus Field. This battle was fought in c. 352 BC between the armies of Phocis, under Onomarchos, and the combined Thessalian and Macedonian army under Philip II. The Phocians were decisively defeated by Philip's forces.

== Death ==
The details concerning Onomarchus' death in 352 BC vary in the written sources. Reportedly, Onomarchus and many of the fugitives plunged into the sea in the hope of swimming to the Athenian ships under Chares which were lying off the shore. The Roman historian, Eusebius states he drowned in this effort. Diodorus (XVI 35) asserts he was taken prisoner and put to death by Phillip. Pausanias states that he died from the darts of his own soldiers.

Onomarchus' body fell into the hands of Philip, who had it crucified as punishment for his sacrilege. Some sources relate that he also killed 3000 Phocian hostages as a punishment for the sacrilege they committed against the Sanctuary of Apollo at Delphi two years earlier.
