= Phalaecus =

4th-century BC Phocian general

Phalaecus (Ancient Greek: Φάλαικος, romanized: Phalaikos) was the ruler of Phocis in Greece during the Third Sacred War before he was ousted. After his ousting he became the leader of a group of mercenaries, whose services were sought by Knossos in Crete. Once he arrived in Crete, Knossos leadership ordered him to attack their enemy, the city of Lyttus. The Lyttians appealed to the Spartans who came to Crete with an army under their king Archidamus III. As Phalaecus was besieging Lyttus, the Spartans arrived and relieved the siege. Later in 343 BC Phalaecus attacked and laid siege to Kydonia, where his army was routed and he was killed.

== Sources ==
- Theocharis Detorakis, (1994). A History of Crete. Heraklion: Heraklion. ISBN 960-220-712-4.
