= Pagonis =

Pagonis is a surname and given name. Notable people with the name include:

surname

- Anastasia Pagonis (born 2004), American Paralympic swimmer
- Kostas Pagonis (born 1985), Greek footballer
- Nenad Pagonis (born 1987), Serbian kickboxer
- Pidgeon Pagonis (born 1986), American intersex activist
- William Pagonis (born 1941), American Army general

given name

- Pagonis Vakalopoulos (born 1965), Greek footballer
