= Corsiae =

Town of ancient Greece

Coordinates: 37°33′38″N 26°29′19″E

Corsiae or Korsiai (Ancient Greek: Κορσιαί) was a town of ancient Greece on the island of same name.

Its site is located near modern Petrokopio on the island of Fournoi.
