= Delphic ambiguity =

Delphic ambiguity is forecasting which is heavily qualified or subject to misinterpretation—a practice attributed to an oracle of Delphi, who answered a question by saying that a great empire would fall if Croesus crossed the River Halys, which was a logical step in his plan to attack the Persian Empire. Such ambiguities are often presumed intentional in their superficial appearance of providing more information than critical examination of their content would support—for example, that famous prophecy might be expected to "come true" whichever of those two respective kingdoms' armies was defeated in detail at the battle which in due course took place beyond that river.

Professional economic projections are sometimes labelled as delphic because of the degree of conditional detail forced by variables that can at best only be estimated.
