= Trikeri =

Trikeri Τρίκερι
- Municipal unit
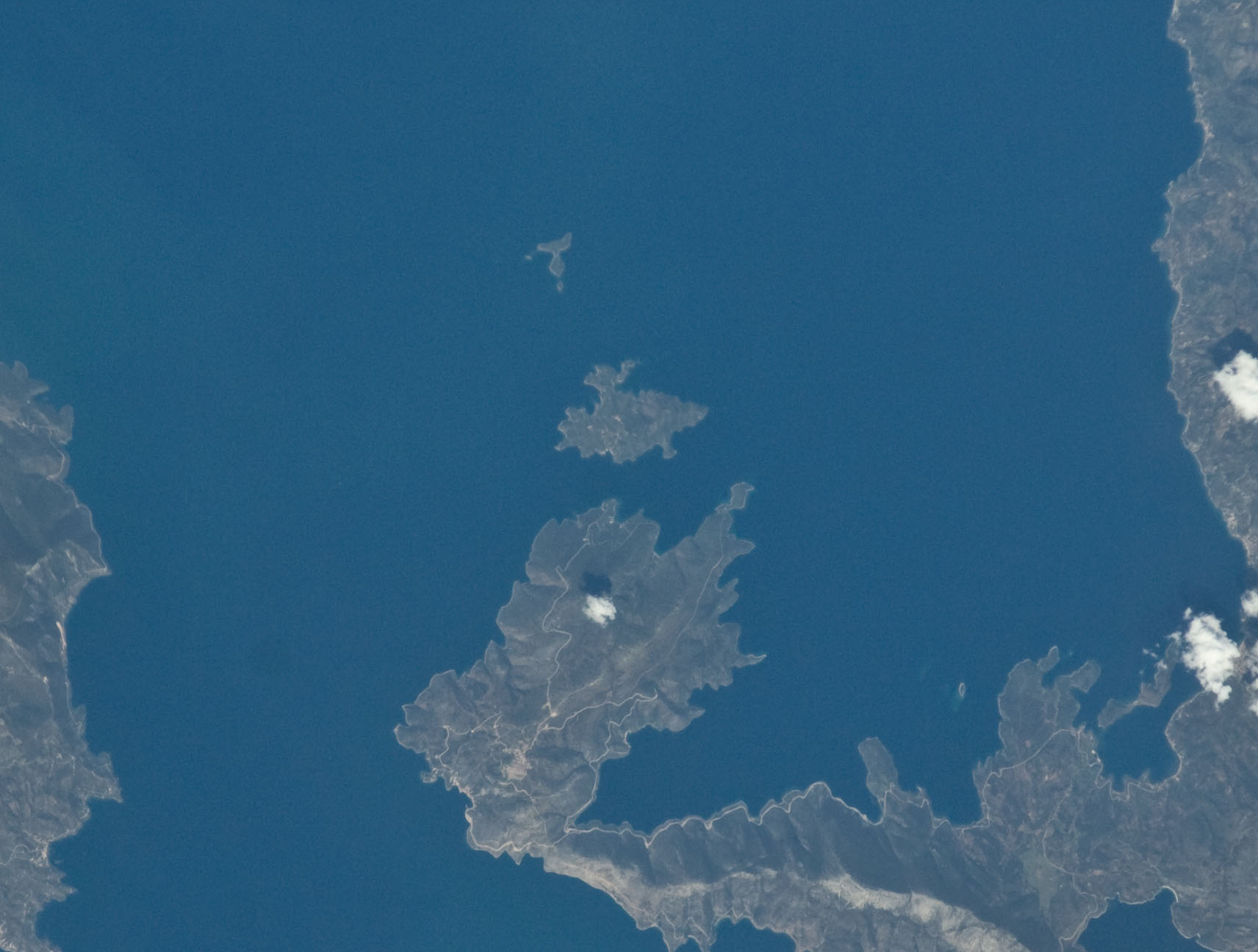
- Satellite view of Trikeri

- Location within the regional unit

- Location within Greece
- Coordinates: 39°06′N 23°05′E
- Country: Greece
- Administrative region: Thessaly
- Regional unit: Magnesia
- Municipality: South Pelion

Area
  - Municipal unit: 26.8 km^{2} (10.3 sq mi)

Population (2021)
  - Municipal unit: 992
  - Municipal unit density: 37.0/km^{2} (95.9/sq mi)
- Time zone: UTC+2 (EET)
  - Summer (DST): UTC+3 (EEST)
- Vehicle registration: ΒΟ

Trikeri (Greek: Τρίκερι, Tríkeri) is a town and a former community in Magnesia, Thessaly, Greece. Since the 2011 local government reform it is part of the municipality South Pelion, of which it is a municipal unit. It lies at the westernmost point of the hook-like Pelion Peninsula on the Pagasetic Gulf. It also includes the offshore islands of Palaio Trikeri and Alatas. The municipal unit has a total population of 992 inhabitants (2021 census), and a land area of 26.817 square kilometres (10.354 sq mi). Its largest settlements are the towns of Trikeri and Agia Kyriaki (Greek: Αγία Κυριακή), both on the mainland.

From 1947 the island of Trikeri was used as a concentration camp for female left-wing political prisoners during the Greek Civil War. The women and children were relatives of members of the EAM-ELAS, the resistance forces which had fought against fascist occupation during World War II.

In September 1949 political activists from other camps were sent to Trikeri, increasing the number of people held there to 4,700.
