= Phocis (ancient region) =

Coordinates: 38.5253°N 22.3753°E

Phocis Φωκίς
- Region of ancient Greece
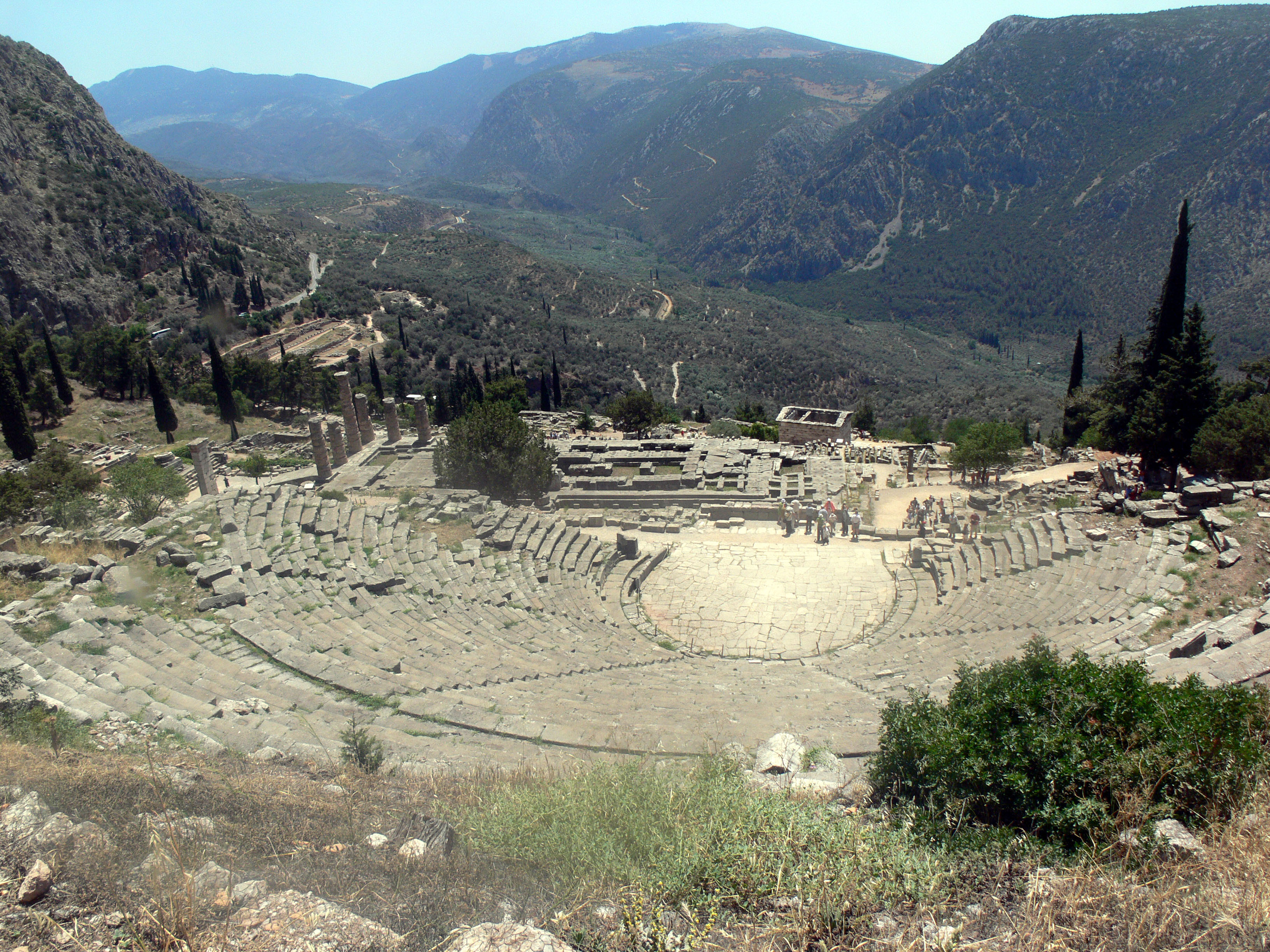
- The ruins of the ancient Greek theatre of Delphi

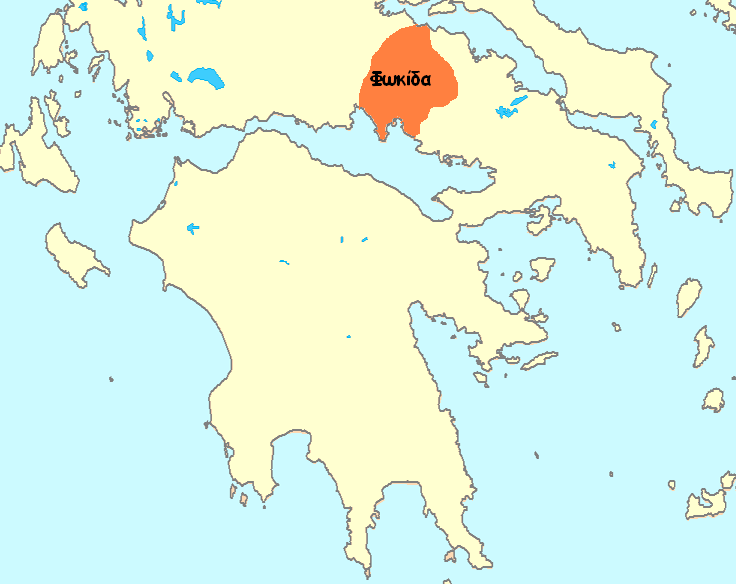
- Map showing location of ancient Phocis
- Location: Central Greece
- Major cities: Delphi, Elatea
- Dialects: Northwest Doric
- Key periods: Third Sacred War (355–346 BC)

Phocis was an ancient region in the central part of ancient Greece, which included Delphi. A modern administrative unit, also called Phocis, is named after the ancient region, although the modern region is substantially larger than the ancient one.

Geopolitically, Phocis was the country of the Phocians, who spoke their own version of Doric Greek, one of the three main dialects of ancient Greek. They were one of several small mountain states of Central Greece, whose dialects are classified as Northwest Doric.

It was from their region that the Dorians crossed the Gulf of Corinth at the beginning of the Greek Iron Age to burn Pylos and other southern Greek strongholds and seize control of the Peloponnesus. The dialects of the two groups of Dorians north and south of the Gulf then began to diverge. One of the states around Phocis was still called Doris in classical times. As there is considerable evidence that the invasion began about 1000 BC, the ancestors of the classical Phocians might be presumed to have been in place there, though not yet speaking Phocian.

== Geography ==
Ancient Phocis was about 1,619 km^{2} (625 sq mi) in area, bounded on the west by Ozolian Locris and Doris, on the north by Opuntian Locris, on the east by Boeotia, and on the south by the Gulf of Corinth. The massive ridge of Parnassus 2,459 m (8,068 ft), which traverses the heart of the country, divides it into two distinct portions.

Being neither rich in material resources nor well placed for commercial enterprise, Phocis was mainly pastoral. No large cities grew up within its territory, and its chief places, such as Delphi and Elatea, were mainly of strategic or cultural importance.

== History ==
=== Classical period ===
The early history of Phocis remains quite obscure. During the Second Persian invasion of Greece in 480 BC the Phocians joined the Hellenic alliance, taking part in the Battle of Thermopylae. However, they were enrolled on the Persian side among other conquered people at the Battle of Plataea.

In 457 BC an attempt to extend their influence to the headwaters of the Cephissus in the territory of Doris brought a Spartan army into Phocis in defence of the "metropolis of the Dorians". A similar enterprise against Delphi in 448 BC was again frustrated by Sparta, but not long afterwards the Phocians recaptured the sanctuary with the help of the Athenians, with whom they had entered into alliance in 454 BC. The subsequent decline of Athenian land power had the effect of weakening this new connection; at the time of the Peloponnesian War Phocis was nominally an ally and dependent of Sparta, and had lost control of Delphi.

In the 4th century BC Phocis was constantly endangered by its Boeotian neighbours. After helping the Spartans to invade Boeotia during the Corinthian War (395–394 BC), the Phocians were placed on the defensive. They received assistance from Sparta in 380 BC, but were afterwards compelled to submit to the growing power of Thebes. The Phocian levy took part in the inroads of Epaminondas into Peloponnesus, except in the final campaign of Mantinea (370–362 BC), from which their contingent was withheld. In return for this negligence the Thebans fastened a religious quarrel upon their neighbours, and secured a penal decree against them from the Amphictyonic synod (356 BC). This led to the Third Sacred War (356–346 BC).

==== Third Sacred War (356–346 BC) ====
The Phocians, led by two capable generals, Philomelus and Onomarchus, replied to the penal decree by seizing Delphi and using its riches to hire a mercenary army. With the aid of their mercenaries, the Phocians carried the war into Boeotia and Thessaly, even defeating in battle Philip II of Macedon. Polyaenus suggests that the first of Onomarchos's victories was aided by the use of the catapults to throw stones into the Macedonian phalanx, as it climbed a slope to attack the Phocians. However then he lost the important Battle of Crocus Field (353 BC or 352 BC) to him; and the Battle of Thermopylae (353 BC). Though driven out of Thessaly by Philip, the war maintained itself for ten years, until the exhaustion of the temple treasures and the treachery of its leaders placed Phocia at Philip's mercy. The conditions which he imposed – the obligation to restore the temple funds, and the dispersion of the population into open villages – were soon disregarded. In 339 BC, the Phocians began to rebuild their cities.

=== Hellenistic period ===
They took part in the Lamian War on the side of the Athenians against Antipater. In 279 BC helped to defend Thermopylae against the Gauls and joined the Aetolian league. Henceforth little more is heard of Phocis. During the 3rd century BC, Phocis passed into the power of Macedonia and of the Aetolian League, to which in 196 BC it was definitely annexed.

=== Roman period ===
Under the dominion of the Roman Republic the Aetolian League was dissolved, but was revived by Augustus, who also restored to Phocis the votes in the Delphic Amphictyony, which Phocis had lost in 346 BC. Augustus instituted an Achaean synod (σύνοδος) comprising the dependent cities of Peloponnese and central Greece; this body sat at Argos and acted as guardian of Hellenic sentiment. This Achaean synod is last heard of under Trajan.

== Notable Phocians ==
- Philomelus of Phocis
- Onomarchus

== External links and sources ==
- Caspari, Maximilian Otto Bismarck (1911). "Phocis" . Encyclopædia Britannica. Vol. 21 (11th ed.). pp. 448–449.
- Fanaticus website: Phokians, 668–450BC
- Jeremy McInerney. The Folds of Parnassos: Land and Ethnicity in Ancient Phokis. University of Texas Press, 1999.
