= South Pelion =

South Pelion Νότιο Πήλιο
- Municipality
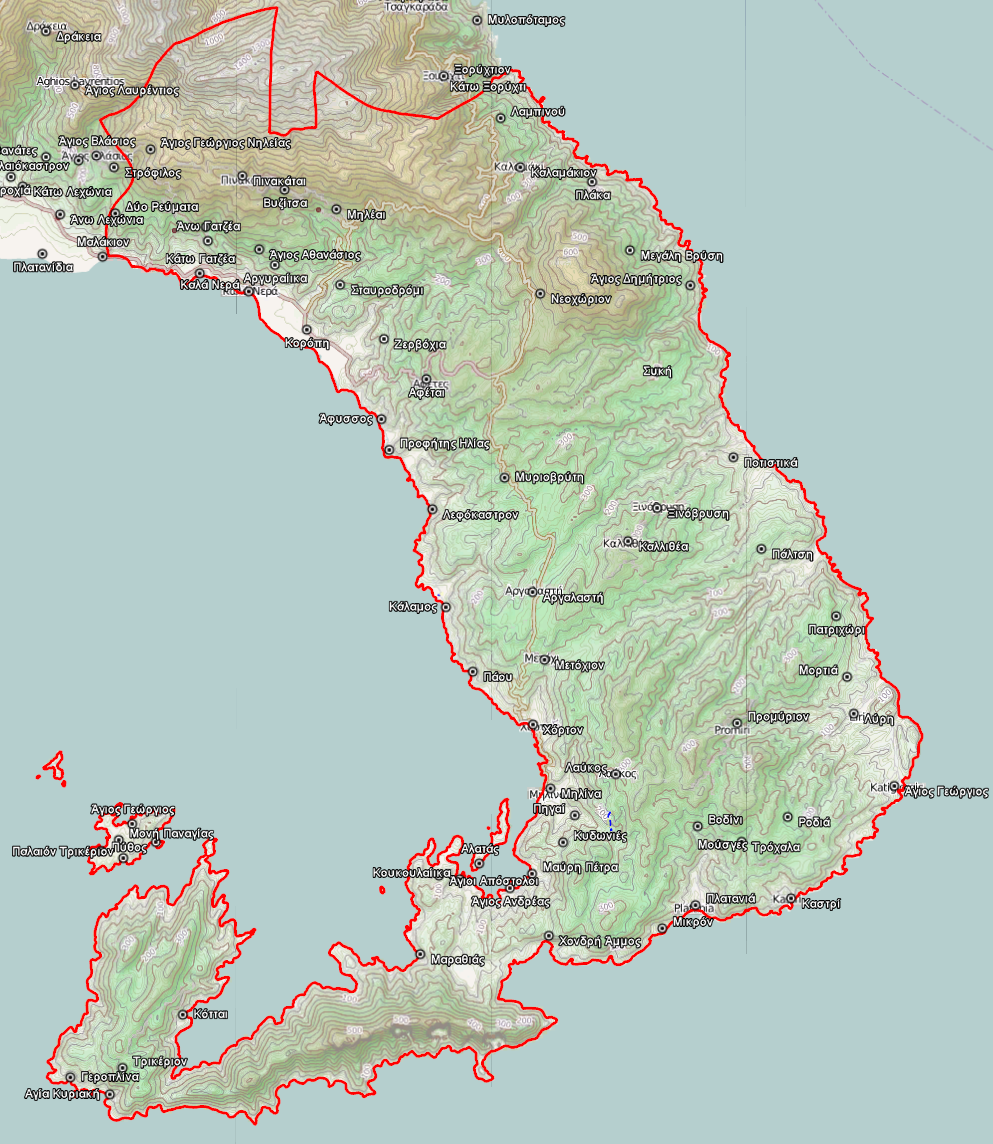
- Notio Pilio municipality map

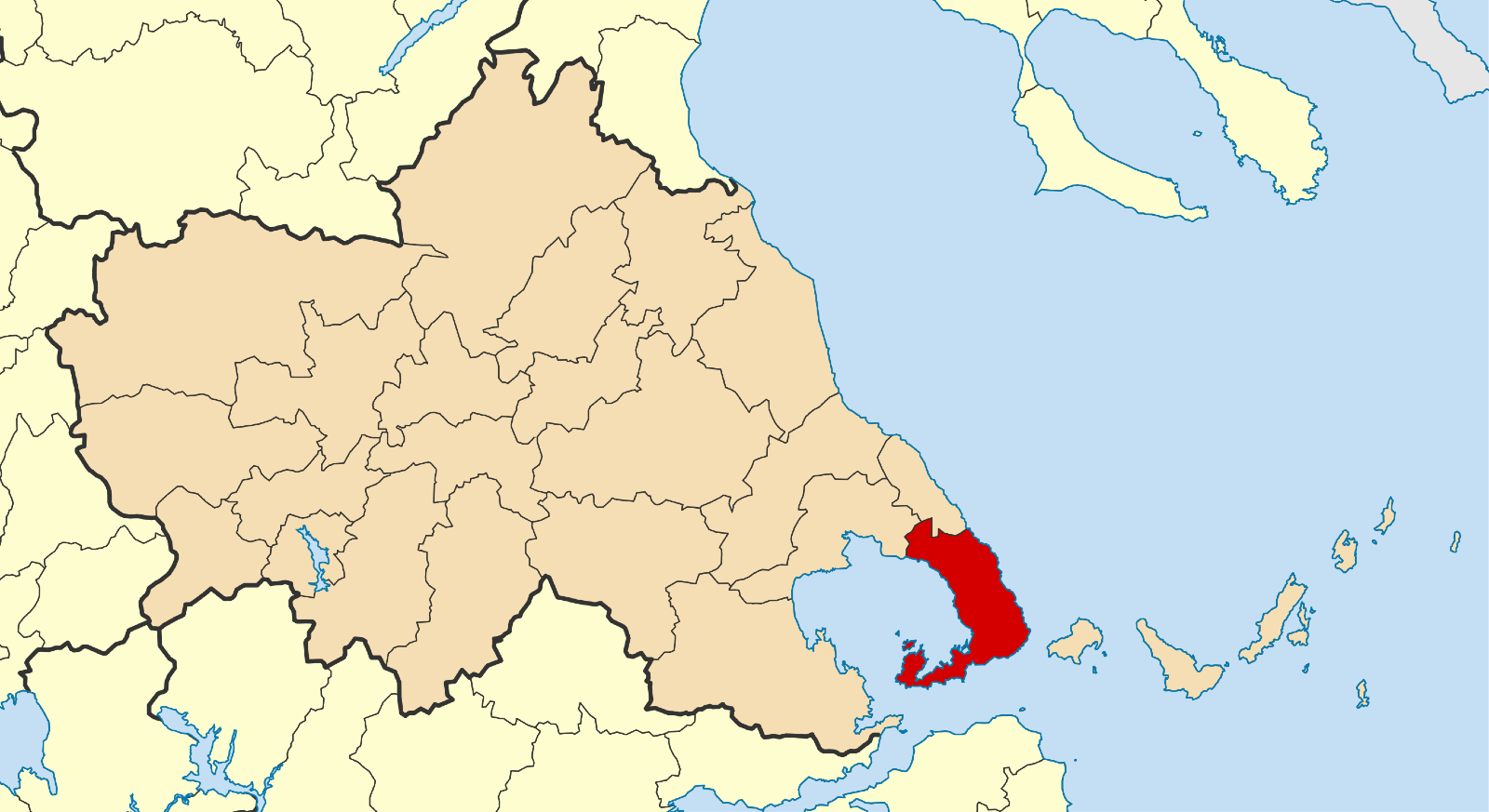

- Location within Greece
- Coordinates: 39°14′N 23°13′E
- Country: Greece
- Administrative region: Thessaly
- Regional unit: Magnesia
- Seat: Argalasti

Area
  - Municipality: 368.5 km^{2} (142.3 sq mi)

Population (2021)
  - Municipality: 8,274
  - Density: 22.45/km^{2} (58.15/sq mi)
- Time zone: UTC+2 (EET)
  - Summer (DST): UTC+3 (EEST)

South Pelion (Greek: Νότιο Πήλιο, Notio Pilio) is a municipality in the Magnesia regional unit, Thessaly, Greece. The seat of the municipality is the town Argalasti. The municipality has an area of 368.539 km^{2}. It comprises the southern part of Mount Pelion.

== Municipality ==
The municipality South Pelion was formed at the 2011 local government reform by the merger of the following 5 former municipalities, that became municipal units:

- Afetes
- Argalasti
- Milies
- Sipiada
- Trikeri
