= Pagasetic Gulf =

- Παγασητικός Κόλπος (Greek)
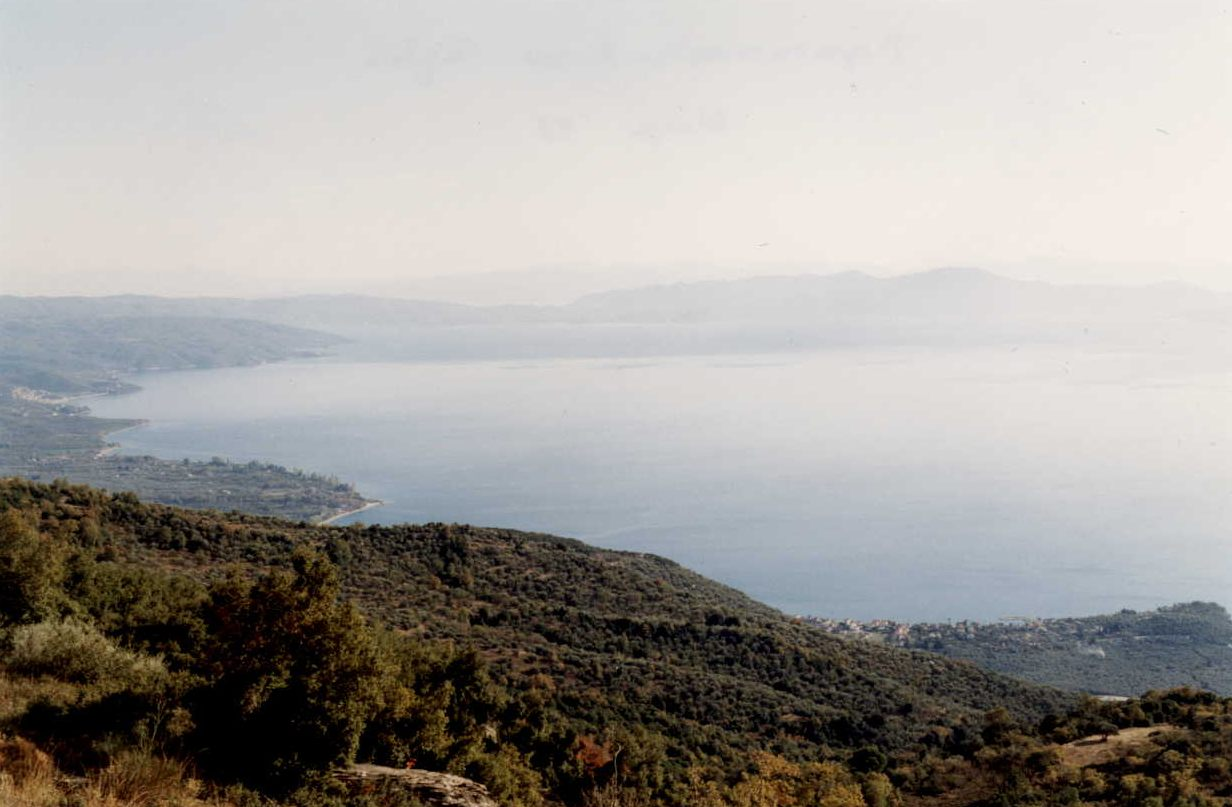
- The eastern side of the Pagasetic Gulf

- Location of the Pagasetic Gulf within Greece
- Location: Magnesia, Greece
- Coordinates: 39°15′N 23°00′E
- Type: Gulf
- Part of: Aegean Sea (Mediterranean)
- Primary inflows: Amphrysus
- Basin countries: Greece
- Surface area: 175 km^{2} (68 sq mi)
- Max. depth: 102 m (335 ft)
- Settlements: Volos

The Pagasetic Gulf (Greek: Παγασητικός Κόλπος, romanized: Pagasitikós Kólpos) is a rounded gulf with a maximum depth of 102 metres (335 ft) in the Magnesia regional unit of east-central Greece. It is formed by the Pelion peninsula and is connected to the Euboic Sea through a narrow channel about 4 km wide.

Its main port and largest city is Volos.

== Mythology and history ==
The gulf is named after its historic major port, Pagasae, from which mythology says that Jason built his ship the Argo and from which he sailed on his adventurous voyage.

The gulf's name in Latin was Pagasaeus Sinus.

== Places within the gulf ==
In clockwise order:

- Amaliapolis, west, port
- Alos, west
- Almyros, west
- Nea Anchialos, northwest, beach and port
- Pagasae, northwest
- Demetrias, northwest
- Iolkos, northwest
- Volos, north, main port
- Agria, northeast, beach and port
- Neochori, east
- Argalasti, east, beaches (Lefokastro, Kalamos, Horto)
- Milina, southeast, beaches
- Trikeri, south, port at Agia Kyriaki

The gulf takes its name from the ancient city of Pagasae.
