= Milies =

Village in Magnesia, Greece

Milies Μηλιές
- Municipal unit
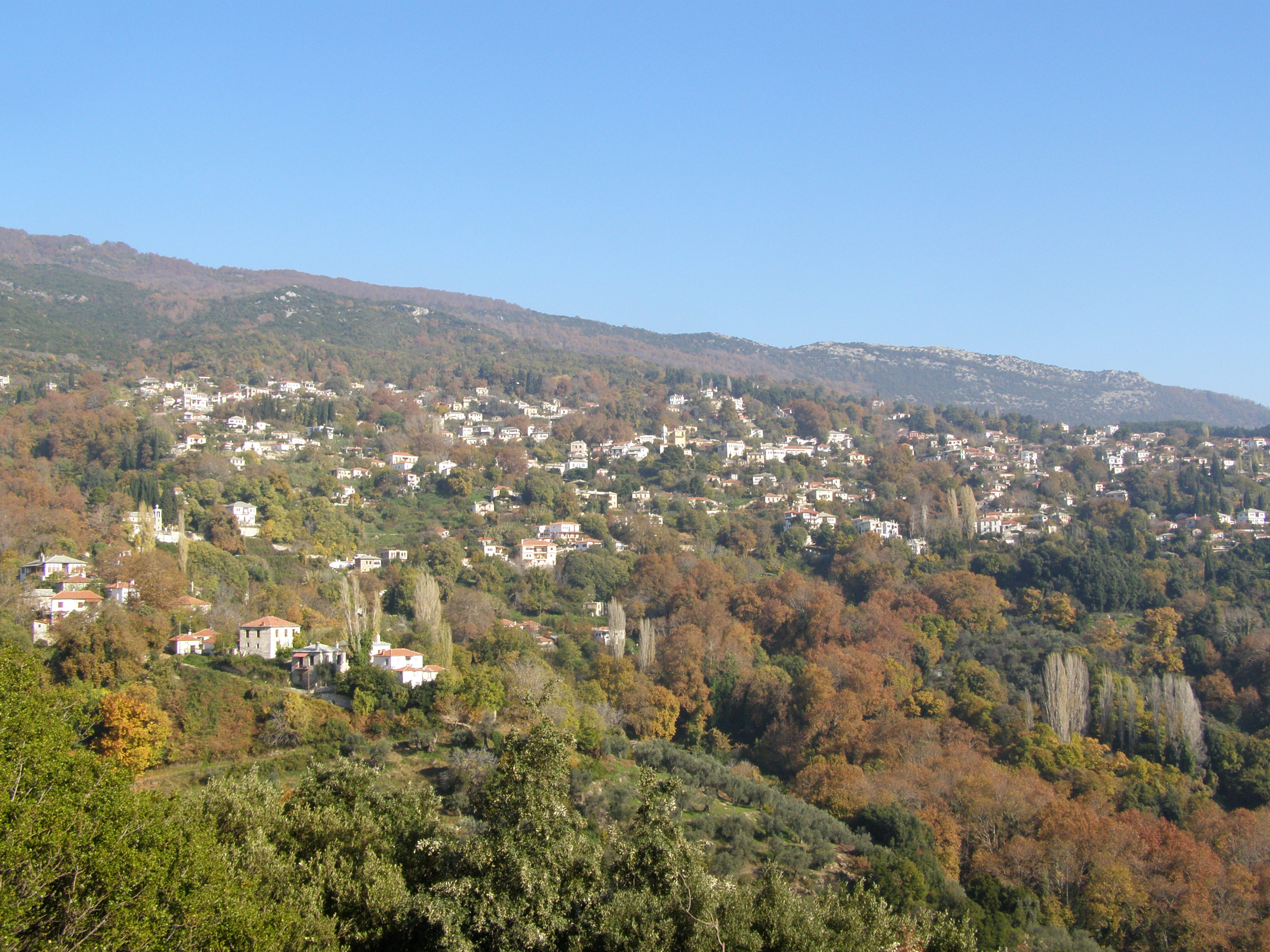

- Location within the regional unit

- Location within Greece
- Coordinates: 39°19.7′N 23°09′E
- Country: Greece
- Administrative region: Thessaly
- Regional unit: Magnesia
- Municipality: South Pelion

Area
  - Municipal unit: 63.8 km^{2} (24.6 sq mi)
- Elevation: 237 m (778 ft)

Population (2021)
  - Municipal unit: 2,737
  - Municipal unit density: 42.9/km^{2} (111/sq mi)
  - Community: 733
- Time zone: UTC+2 (EET)
  - Summer (DST): UTC+3 (EEST)
- Postal code: 37300
- Area code: 24230
- Vehicle registration: ΒΟ

Milies (Greek: Μηλιές) is a village and a former municipality in Magnesia, Thessaly, Greece. Since the 2011 local government reform it is part of the municipality South Pelion, of which it is a municipal unit. The municipal unit has an area of 63.754 km^{2}. It is a traditional Greek mountain village, at a height of 400 m on Mount Pelion. It is 28 km from Volos, the capital city of Magnesia. Milies is connected with Magnesia provincial roads 8 and 9, both of which leads to the EO34 road (Volos–Neochori–Chorefto). It has traditional stone houses, cobbled roads, good restaurants and accommodation in abundance. Milies is also notable for being the terminus of the narrow gauge (60 cm) Pelion Railway, built between 1895 and 1903 by the Italian engineer, Evaristo de Chirico, father of the famous artist Giorgio de Chirico. This proved to be of considerable economic advantage to the region. The recently railway runs between Ano Lechonia and Milies twice a week at the weekend. The village commands striking views across the Pagasetic Gulf and benefits from the many streams and water sources for which Mt. Pelion is renowned. These result in rich vegetation and cool, forested mountain slopes.

== Subdivisions ==
The municipal unit Milies is subdivided into the following communities (constituent villages in brackets):

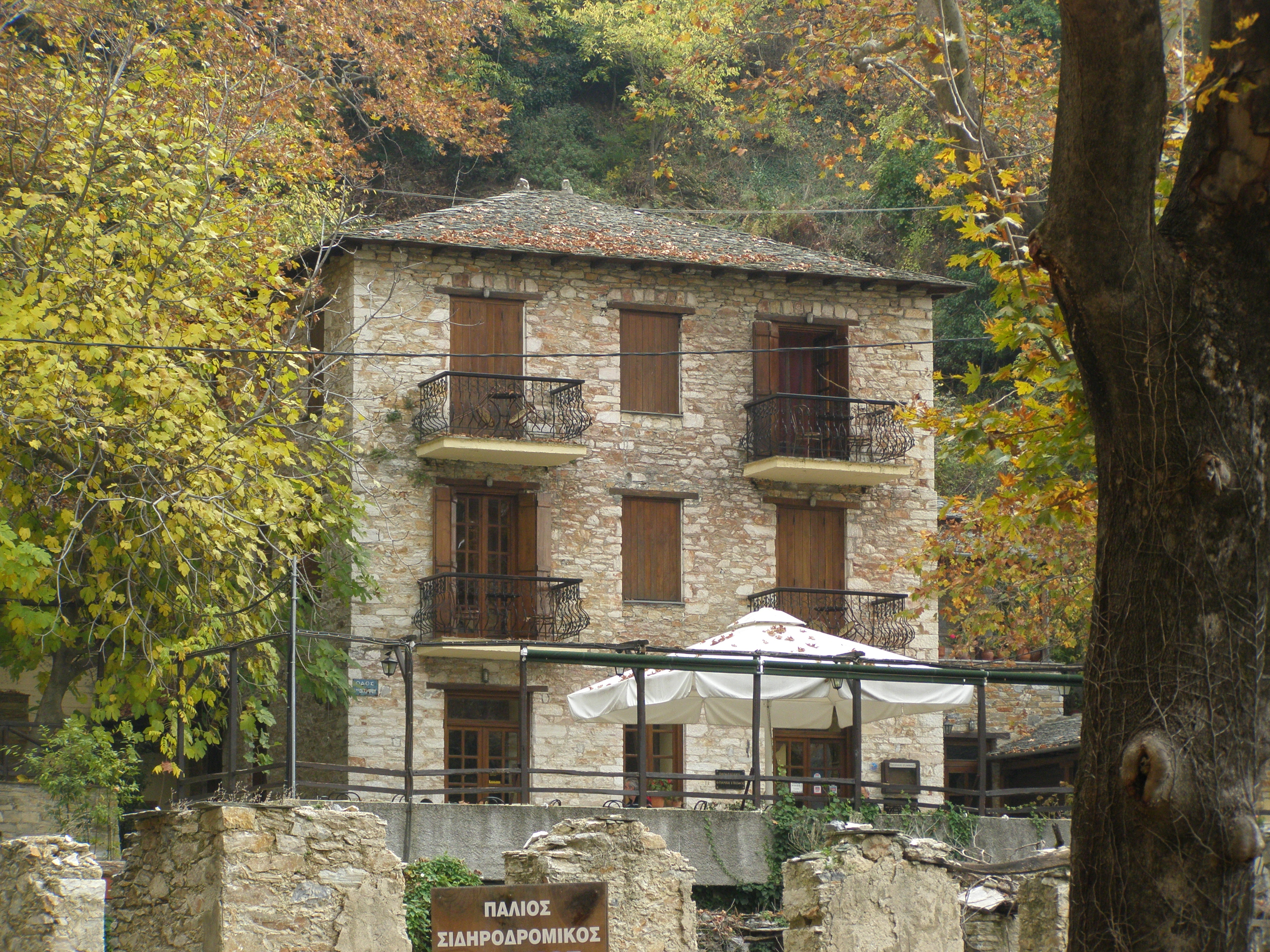
Traditional building of Milies.

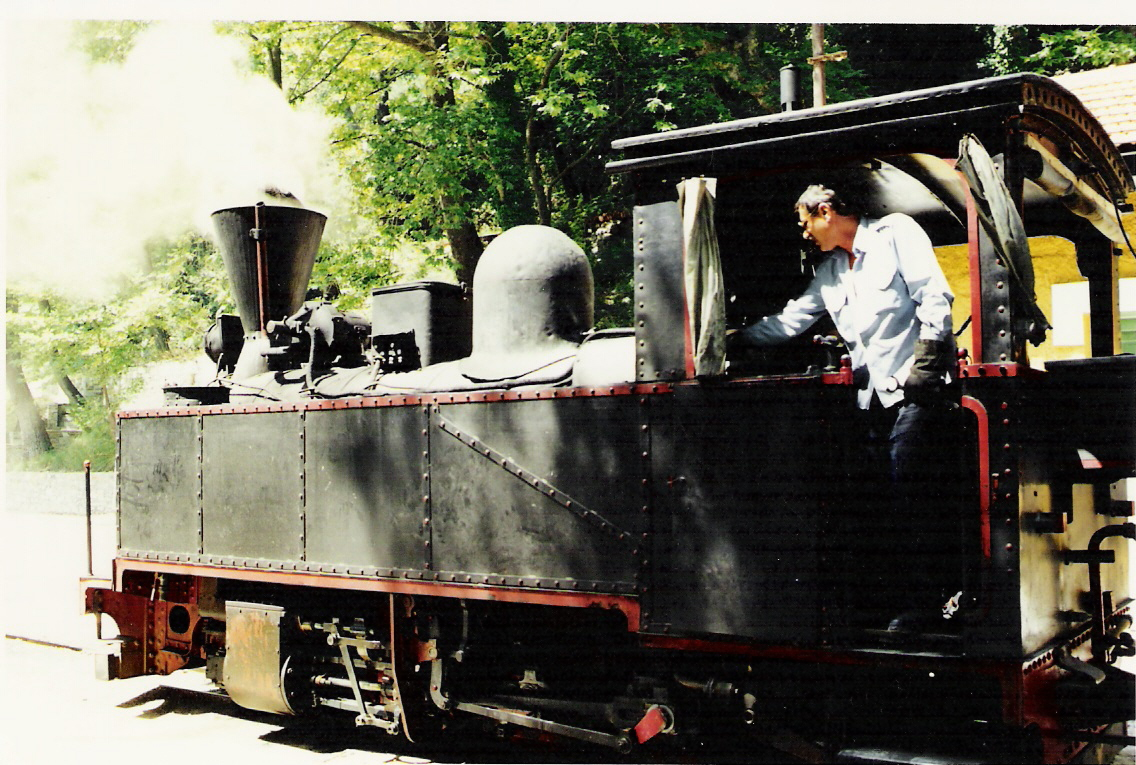
2-4-0 Tubize steam engine in the train station of Milies.

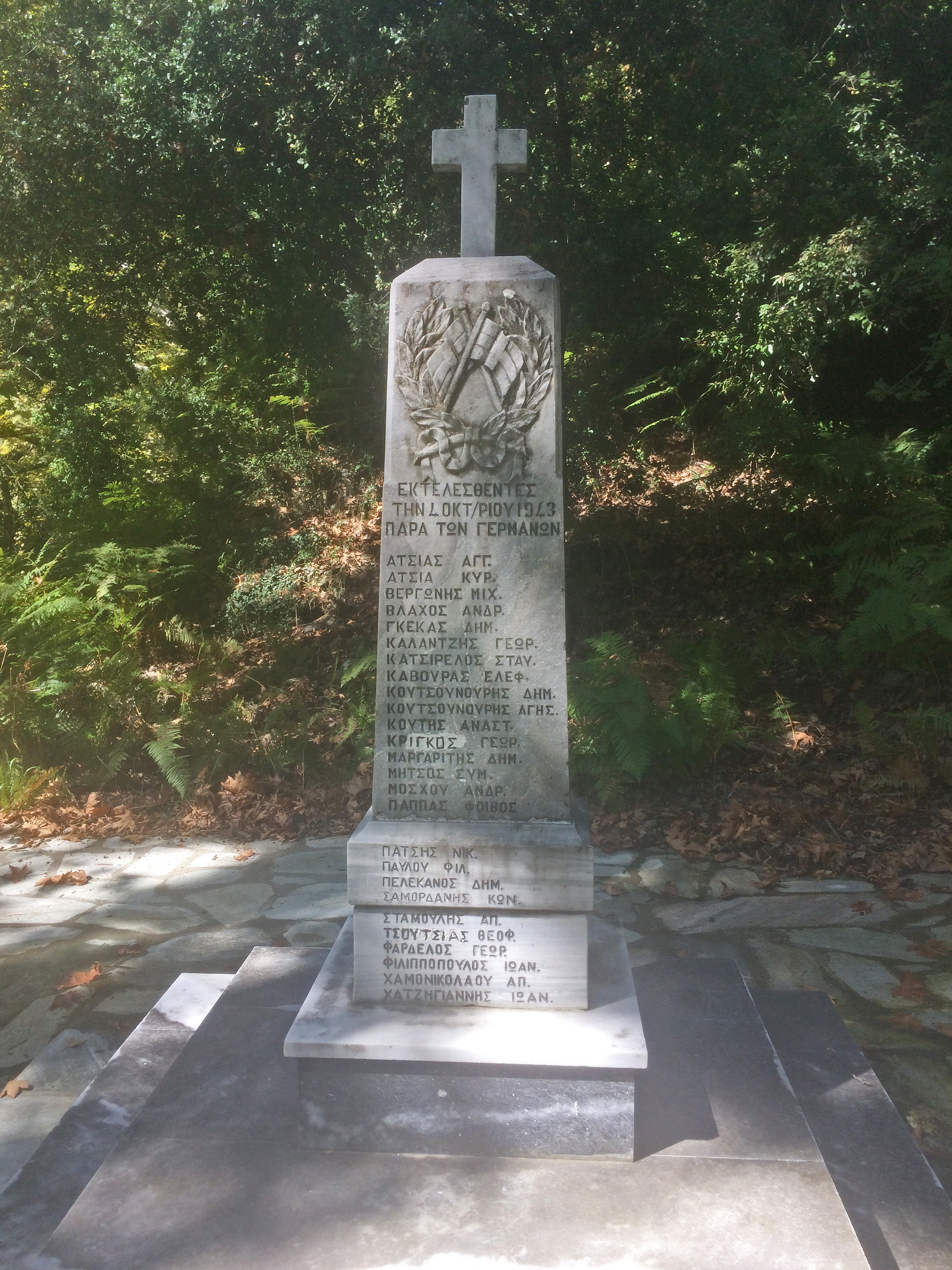
Memorial for people executed by German occupation troops in 1943

- Agios Georgios Nileias (Agios Georgios Nileias, Agia Triada, Ano Gatzea, Dyo Revmata, Kato Gatzea)
- Kala Nera
- Milies (Milies, Koropi, Stavrodromi)
- Pinakates (Pinakates, Agios Athanasios)
- Vyzitsa (Vyzitsa, Argyreika)

== Nearest places ==
- Koropi
- Kala Nera, southwest
- Ano Lechonia, northwest
- Stavrodromoi

== Population ==
Year	Municipal unit population	Village population	Community population
1981	-	-	1,102
1991	3,737	-	952
2001	3,513	636	1,056
2011	3,085	640	900
2021	2,737	-	733

== Geography ==
The Pelion mountains dominate the area, the valley covers the central part. Farmlands are adjacent to the village, which produces fruits, olives and vegetables.

== History ==
The town was founded by people fleeing pirate attacks on Milies on the island of Euboea. The town was constructed inland and while the sea can be seen from the village, the community cannot be seen from the sea. Anthimos Gazis and Grigorios Konstantas opened the school "Psychis Akos" in 1814 which is now a library with books and historic features. Milies was the first community of Pelion which saw the Greek War of Independence of 1821. Magnesia lost the battle and did not join the Greek Kingdom until 1881. When Milies and the area became part of Greece in 1881, the Ottomans left the area.

During the German Occupation in World War II nearly the whole village was burnt down by German occupation troops on October 4, 1943. According to the official report of the municipality the Germans executed 25 men and three inhabitants died in their houses by the flames. This was after the resistance had killed a German officer and a soldier nearby eight days before on September 26.

== Landmarks ==
The towns feature's a church known as Agios Taxiarchos (built in 1741).

== Notable people ==
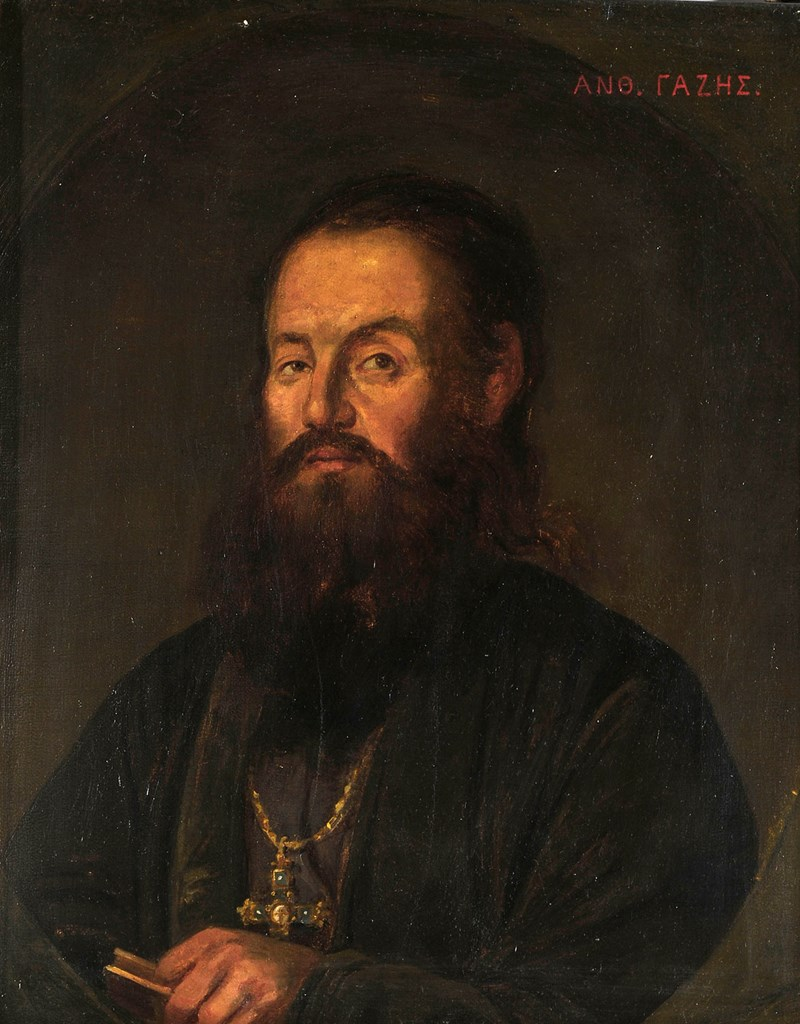
Anthimos Gazis

- Anthimos Gazis (1758–1828), scholar of the Greek Enlightenment
- Grigorios Konstantas (1753–1844)
- Daniel Philippidis (ca. 1750–1832)
- Konstantinos Garefis (1874-1906), chieftain of the Macedonian Struggle

== Sister cities ==
- Lapithos, Cyprus
- Bălţi, Moldova

== See also ==
- List of settlements in the Magnesia regional unit

== Sources ==
- Helen F. Stamati: Milies: A Village on Mount Pelion. Athenian Press, Athens 1989.
