= Koropi, Magnesia =

Koropi Κορόπη
- Settlement
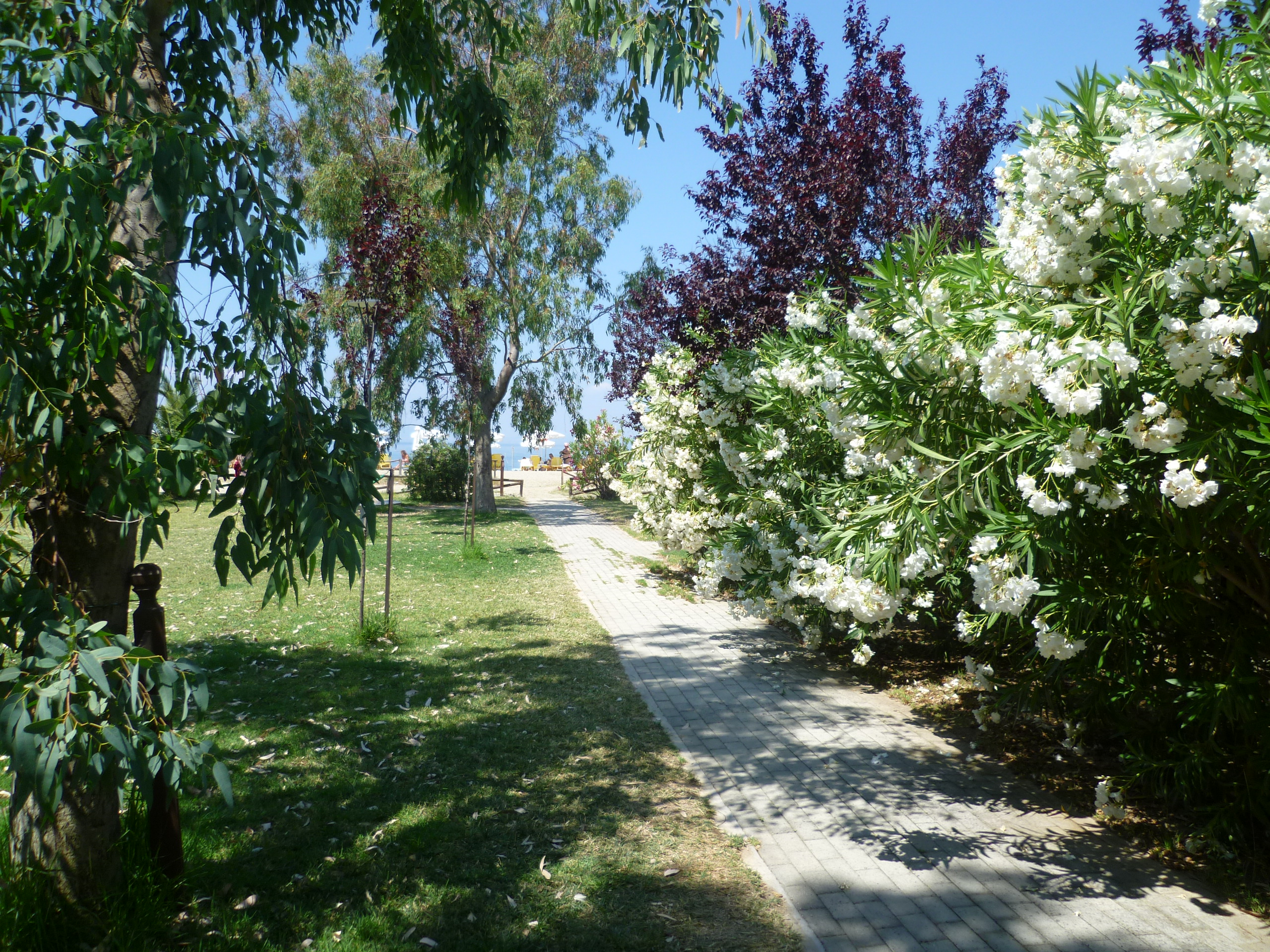
- Flowers at Koropi

- Location within Greece
- Coordinates: 39°18′N 23°09′E
- Country: Greece
- Administrative region: Thessaly
- Regional unit: Magnesia
- Municipality: South Pelion
- Municipal unit: Milies
- Community: Milies

Population (2021)
  - Total: 288
- Time zone: UTC+2 (EET)
  - Summer (DST): UTC+3 (EEST)
- Vehicle registration: ΒΟ

Koropi (Greek: Κορόπη, before 1927: Μπούφα - Boufa) is a village in the municipal unit of Milies, Magnesia regional unit, Greece. Koropi is situated on the Pelion peninsula, on the coast of the Pagasetic Gulf. Koropi is 2 km southeast of Kala Nera, 4 km east of Milies and 19 km southeast of Volos. The name Koropi was taken from the ancient city Korope, which dates from the 8th century BC. It was a small city that had a Temple of Apollo.

== Population ==
Year	Population
1991	281
1991	269
2001	398
2011	246
2021	288

== See also ==
- List of settlements in the Magnesia regional unit
