= Pavlopoulos =

Pavlopoulos (Greek: Παυλόπουλος) is a Greek surname, which means son of Paul. The female version of the name is Pavlopoulou (Greek: Παυλοπούλου). Notable examples include:

- George Pavlopoulos (1924–2008), Greek poet
- Konstantinos Pavlopoulos (born 1971), Greek former footballer
- Nikolaos Pavlopoulos (1909–1990), Greek sculptor and writer
- Prokopis Pavlopoulos (born 1950), Greek lawyer, professor and politician
