= Kala Nera =

Kala Nera Καλά Νερά
- Community
- Location within Greece
- Coordinates: 39°18′N 23°08′E
- Country: Greece
- Administrative region: Thessaly
- Regional unit: Magnesia
- Municipality: South Pelion
- Municipal unit: Milies

Population (2021)
  - Community: 539
- Time zone: UTC+2 (EET)
  - Summer (DST): UTC+3 (EEST)
- Vehicle registration: ΒΟ

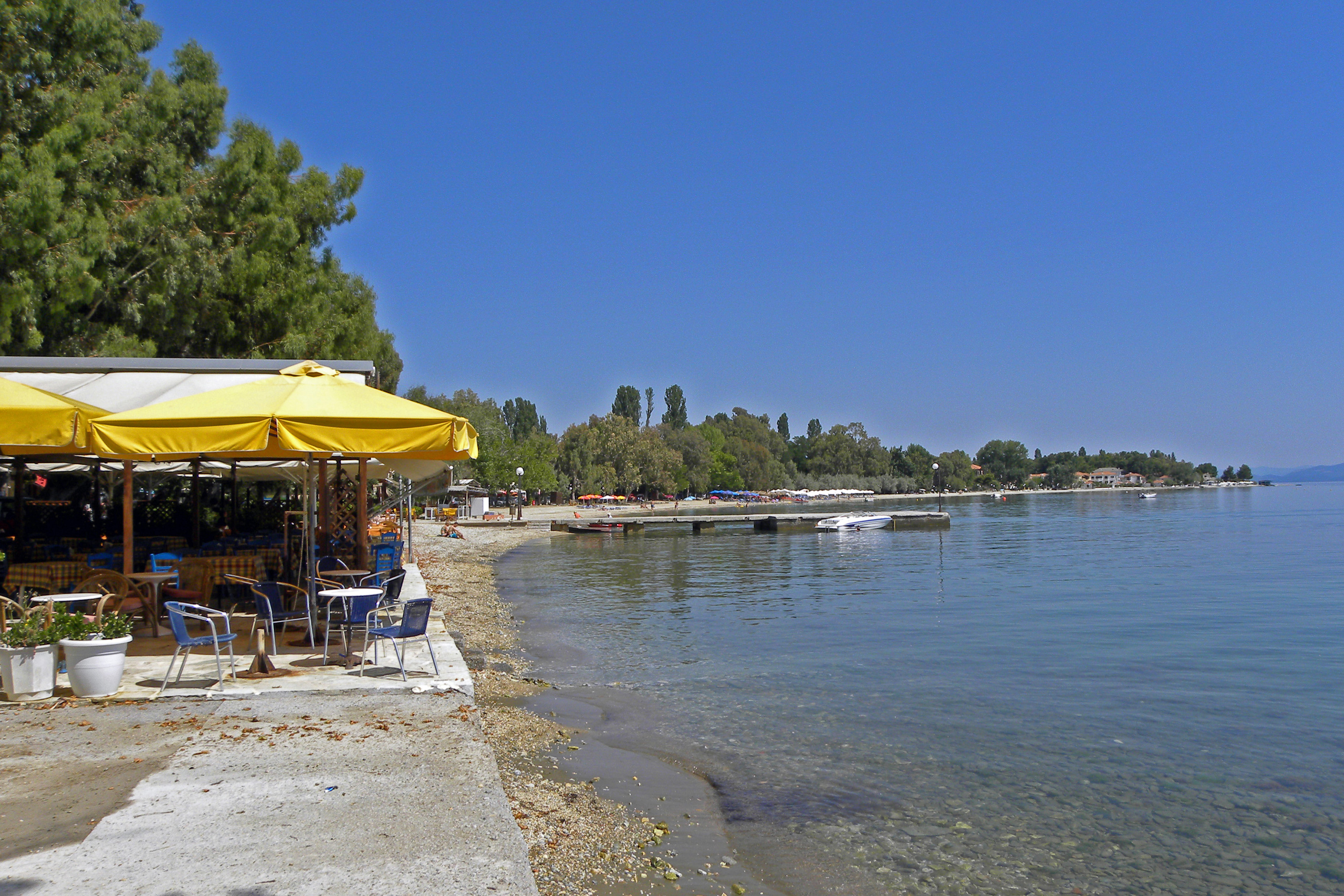

Kala Nera (Greek: Καλά Νερά meaning "good waters") is a village in the municipal unit of Milies, Magnesia, Greece. It is situated in the western part of the mountainous Pelion peninsula, on the Pagasetic Gulf coast. It is 3 km southwest of Milies, 5 km southeast of Agios Georgios Nileias and 17 km southeast of Volos.

== Population ==
Historical population
Year	Pop.	±%
1981	550	—
1991	485	−11.8%
2001	562	+15.9%
2011	594	+5.7%
2021	539	−9.3%

== See also ==
- List of settlements in the Magnesia regional unit
