= Ano Lechonia =

Town in the Magnesia regional unit, Greece

Ano Lechonia Άνω Λεχώνια
- Community
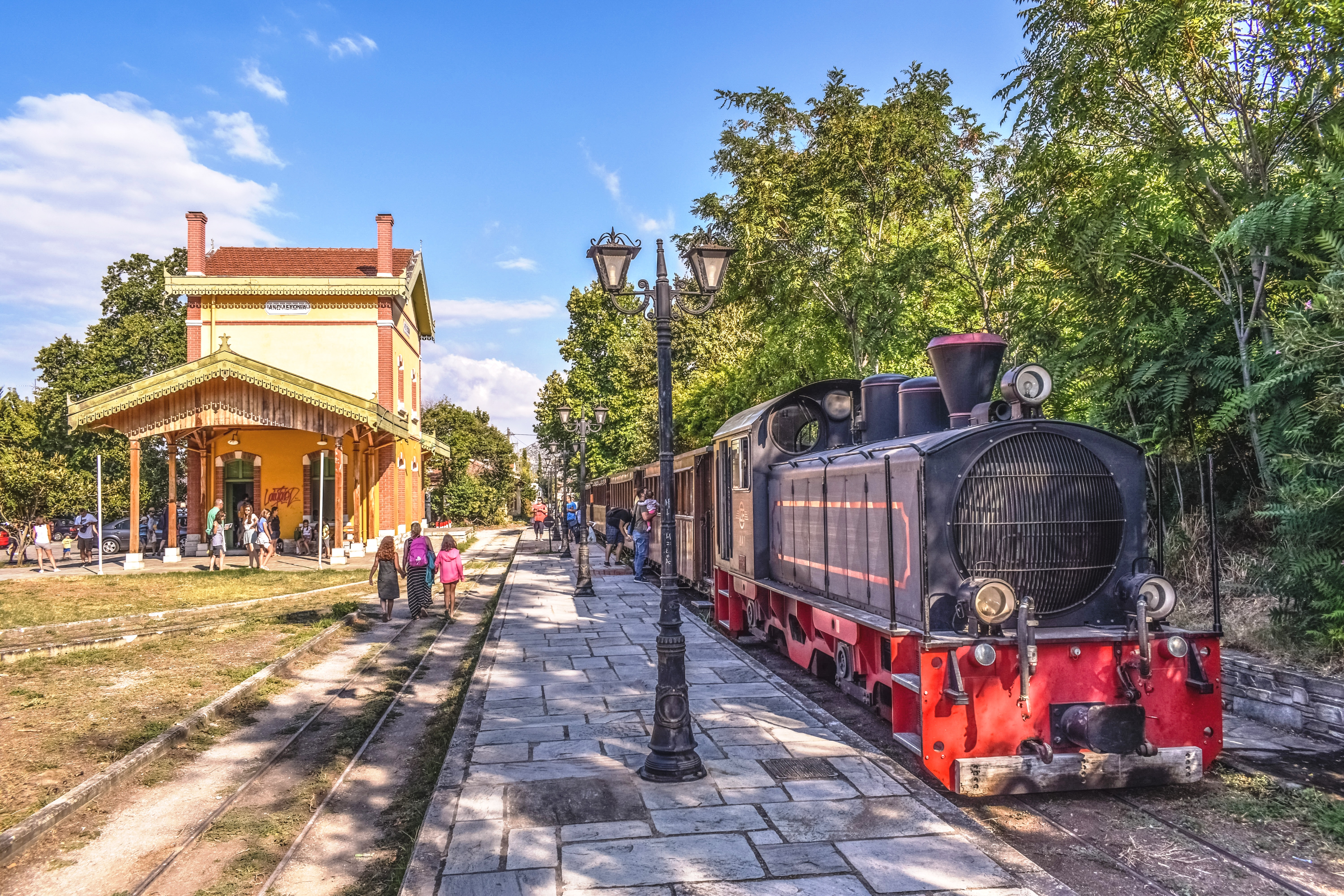
- Ano Lechonia's railway station.

- Location within Greece
- Coordinates: 39°19′N 23°3′E
- Country: Greece
- Administrative region: Thessaly
- Regional unit: Magnesia
- Municipality: Volos
- Municipal unit: Artemida
- Lowest elevation: 75 m (246 ft)

Population (2021)
  - Community: 1,252
- Time zone: UTC+2 (EET)
  - Summer (DST): UTC+3 (EEST)
- Postal code: 370 06
- Area code: 24230
- Vehicle registration: BO

Ano Lechonia (Greek: Άνω Λεχώνια) is a town and community in the Magnesia regional unit, Greece. Ano Lechonia was the seat of the former municipality of Artemida. The community includes the coastal village Platinidia. Ano Lechonia is situated in the northwestern part of the Pelion peninsula, 1.5 km from the Pagasetic Gulf coast, 3 km southwest of Agios Georgios Nileias, 4 km southeast of Agria and 11 km (7 mi) southeast of Volos.

After 1996, Ano Lechonia is the end stop of the heritage Pelion Railway, operated by the Hellenic Train (former OSE).

== Population ==
Year	Town population	Community population
1981	1,335	-
1991	1,224	-
2001	1,220	1,439
2011	1,068	1,429
2021	983	1,252

== History ==
The name Lechonia may come from the Slavic word lech meaning "field". Historians say it was the ancient city Methone. At the hill named Nevestiki the ruins of an ancient wall have been found. The residents of Methone supported the Argonauts with ships. After four centuries of Ottoman rule, Ano Lechonia became part of Greece in 1881, as a consequence of the transfer of Thessaly to Greece following the Treaty of Berlin (1878). It was connected by a railway to Volos in 1895.

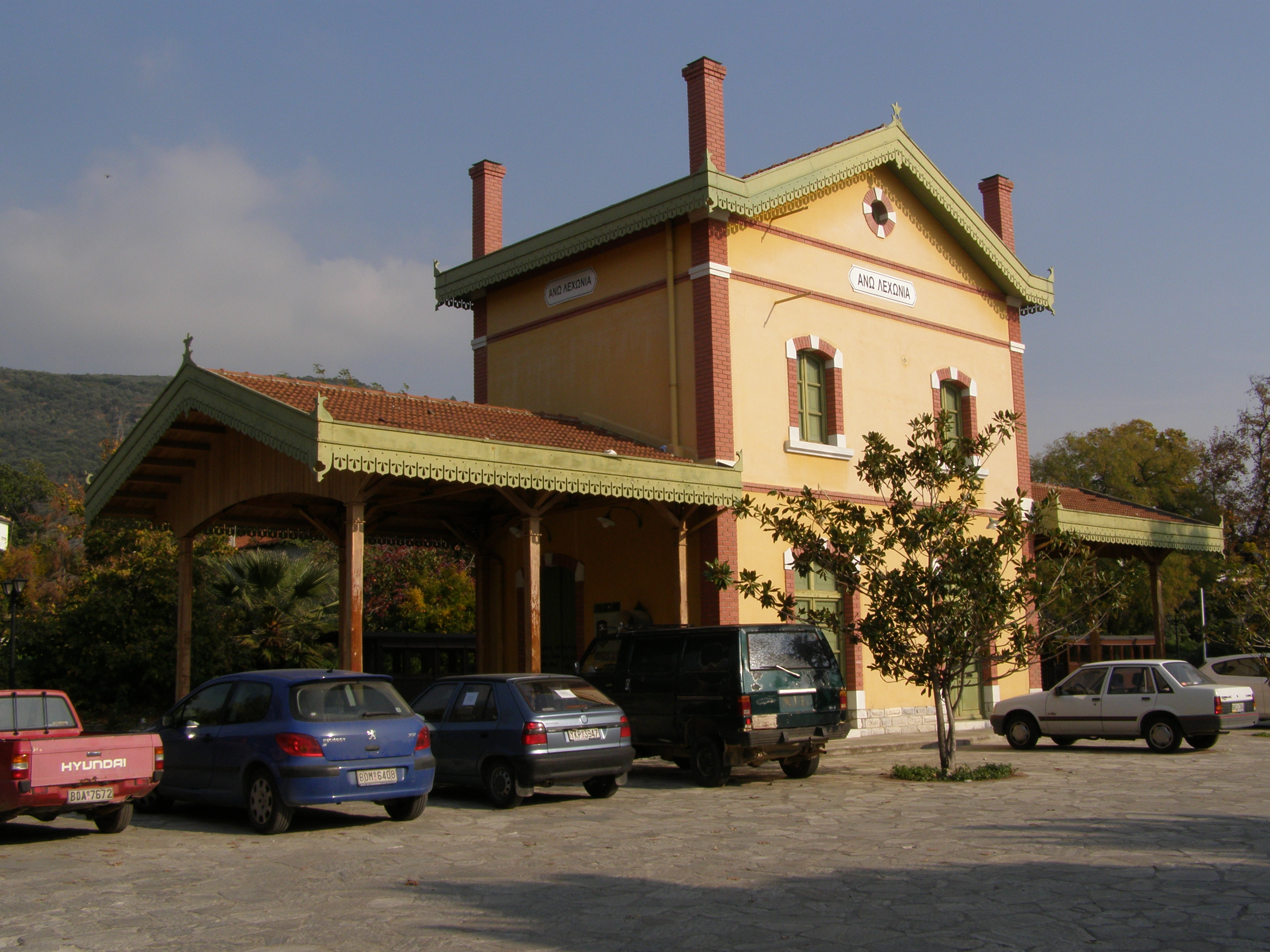
View of the railway station

== See also ==
- List of settlements in the Magnesia regional unit
