= Konstantinos Garefis =

Kapetan (Chieftain) Konstantinos Garefis
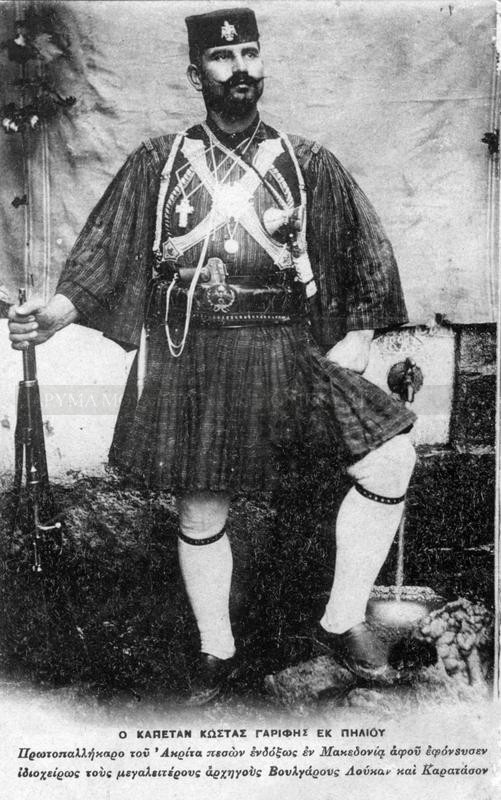
- Garefis during the Macedonian Struggle.
- Native name: Κωνσταντίνος Γαρέφης
- Born: c. 1874
- Died: 24 August 1906
- Allegiance: Kingdom of Greece
- Branch: HMC
- Conflicts: Macedonian Struggle †

Konstantinos Garefis (Greek: Κωνσταντίνος Γαρέφης) was a Greek chieftain of the Macedonian Struggle.

== Biography ==
Garefis was born in 1874 in Milies of Magnesia. His grandfather, who was from Souli, was prosecuted by Ali Pasha, settled in Milies in order to get away. Garefis was of half Epirot and half Sarakatsani origin.

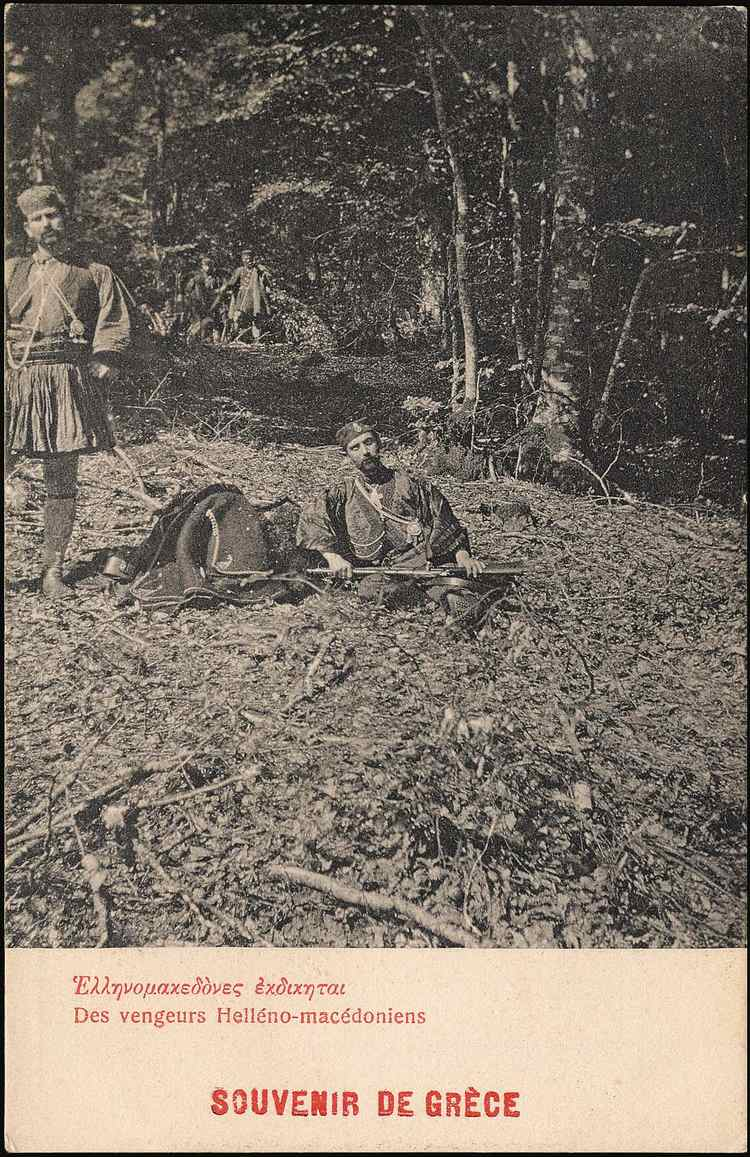
Garefis with chieftain Captain Akritas.

=== Armed actions ===
In 1905 Garefis joined the Macedonian Struggle and became the co-leader of Konstantinos Mazarakis-Ainian's armed group, acting mainly in Vermio. When the action of Konstantinos Mazarakis became known and his group had to be dissolved, Garefis replaced him by organizing his own armed group in the late 1905, expanding the range of action and restoring security to the area.

=== Final moments ===
On August 6, 1906, he discovered the hut in the village of Chernesovo Aridea (now Garefio), in which his enemies were hiding, the komitadjis Lucas and Karatasos. Captain Garefis, with no fear, entered the hut and killed Karatasos and heavily injured Lucas. However, during the clash, he was injured by the men of Luca. Garefis, despite his serious injury, insisted, before he left the field of battle, to see the result of it which was successful.

Few days later he died because of the wounds on August 24, 1906.

In 1922, Chernesovo got renamed to Garefio to honour him.

== Sources ==
- Βασίλης Κ. Γούναρης, "Η ιστοριογραφία και η χαρτογραφία του Μακεδονικού Ζητήματος", στην ιστοσελίδα /www.imma.edu.gr του Ιδρύματος Μουσείου Μακεδονικού Αγώνα.
- Κώστας Λιάπης, "Κώστας Γαρέφης (1874-1906)"
- Κωνσταντίνος Γαρέφης, 1874 - 1906, "Μακεδόνες Μακεδονομάχοι", p. 58-60
- Μακεδονομάχοι - Κωνσταντίνος Γαρέφης
