= Pelion railway =

Scenic heritage railway in Greece

Ano Lechonia–Mileai railway

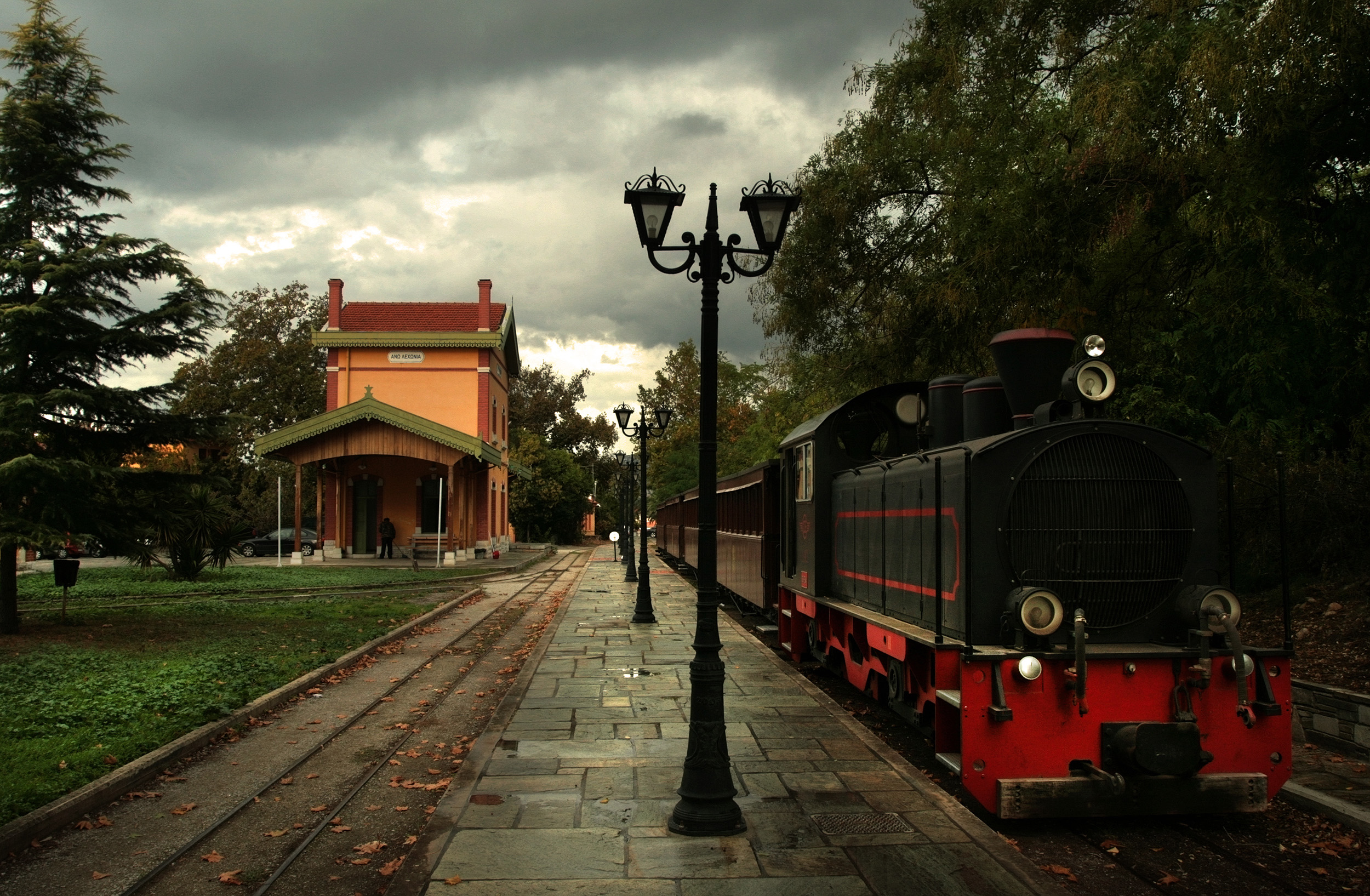
- Schöma engine at Ano Lechonia railway station, 2009

Overview
- Status: Operational up to Ano Lechonia
- Owner: Hellenic Railways Organisation
- Locale: Greece (Thessaly)
- Termini: Ano Lechonia 39.3254900°N 23.0538832°E; Mileai 39.3276452°N 23.1436329°E
- Stations: 3

Service
- Type: Heritage line
- Operator(s): Hellenic Train

History
- Opened: June 1894

Technical
- Line length: 28.2 km (17.5 mi)
- Number of tracks: single track
- Character: Heritage
- Track gauge: 600 mm (1 ft 11 5/8 in)
- Electrification: no

Pelion railway is a 600 mm (1 ft 11 5/8 in) narrow gauge railway line of Thessaly Railways private-owned company in Greece, connecting the city of Volos with the town of Mileai on Pelion.

== History ==
After Thessaly Railways completed the construction of the 1,000 mm (3 ft 3 3/8 in) metre gauge lines from Volos to Larissa and Kalampaka (1886) they decided to extend their network eastwards, to connect Volos with the communities of Pelion Peninsula. Due to limited space and mountainous terrain they decided to build this extension in 600 mm (1 ft 11 5/8 in) narrow gauge. The new line extended from Volos station through Volos city centre (as a tramway) to Agria (1892), reaching Ano Lechonia in 1896 and Mileai (Milies) in 1903.

The section from Volos station to Anavros is essentially a tramway. In addition to Pelion trains, tram services have operated in the past on this section. From Anavros to Agria and Lechonia the line has no special features, most notable being the concrete bridge over River Vrychon.

In contrast, the mountain section from Ano Lechonia to Mileai has a number of interesting civil engineering features, including seven stone bridges, an iron bridge at Milies, two tunnels and five stone road bridges over the line. Engine sheds were built at Volos, Agria and Mileai, but now the locomotives are maintained at a new shed at Ano Lechonia. Turntables were installed at Volos and Mileai, the latter being replaced recently with a new one of larger diameter to accommodate the diesel locomotives. Water towers were built at Agria, Ano Lechonia (still in use) and Mileai.

The railway was designed by Evaristo de Chirico whose son is the Metaphysical painter, Giorgio de Chirico.

The line was operated by Thessaly Railways private company until 1955 and then taken over by the Hellenic State Railways state-owned company. In 1971 it was transferred with the rest of the Greek railway lines to Hellenic Railways Organisation (OSE), which promptly suspended the service as a cost-saving measure.

The section from Volos to Agria was operated as a heritage railway by "The Friends of Pelion Railway" between 1987 and 1994, before being forced to terminate the operation. However, in 1996 OSE reopened the section from Ano Lechonia to Mileai as a heritage railway, initially using steam traction and converting to diesel traction in 1999. The stations of Ano Lechonia and Agria, which had been severely damaged by earthquakes, were restored according to the original designs.

== Current services ==
Currently, Hellenic Train runs one train every Saturday, Sunday and public holiday from mid-April to the end of October. The train runs every day during July and August. According to the current timetable (May 2012), train 3800 departs Ano Lechnonia at 10:00 and arrives at Milies at 11:35. Return train 3801 departs Milies at 15:00 and arrives at Ano Lechnonia at 16:30.

== Rolling stock ==
Numbers	Type	QTY	Manufacturer	Model	Power (HP)	Year	Photo	Note
	0-8-0T	3	Weidknecht (fr)			1892		
	0-4-0T	1	Weidknecht			1892		
	2-6-0T	2	Ateliers métallurgiques (fr) Tubize			1909		
	2-6-0T	3	Haine St. Pierre (fr)			1912		
	0-4-0T	2	Decauville (fr)			1912		
	4-6-0T	1	Baldwin			1917–1950		
A1, A2		2	Schoema (de)			1999		diesel locomotive

== Gallery ==
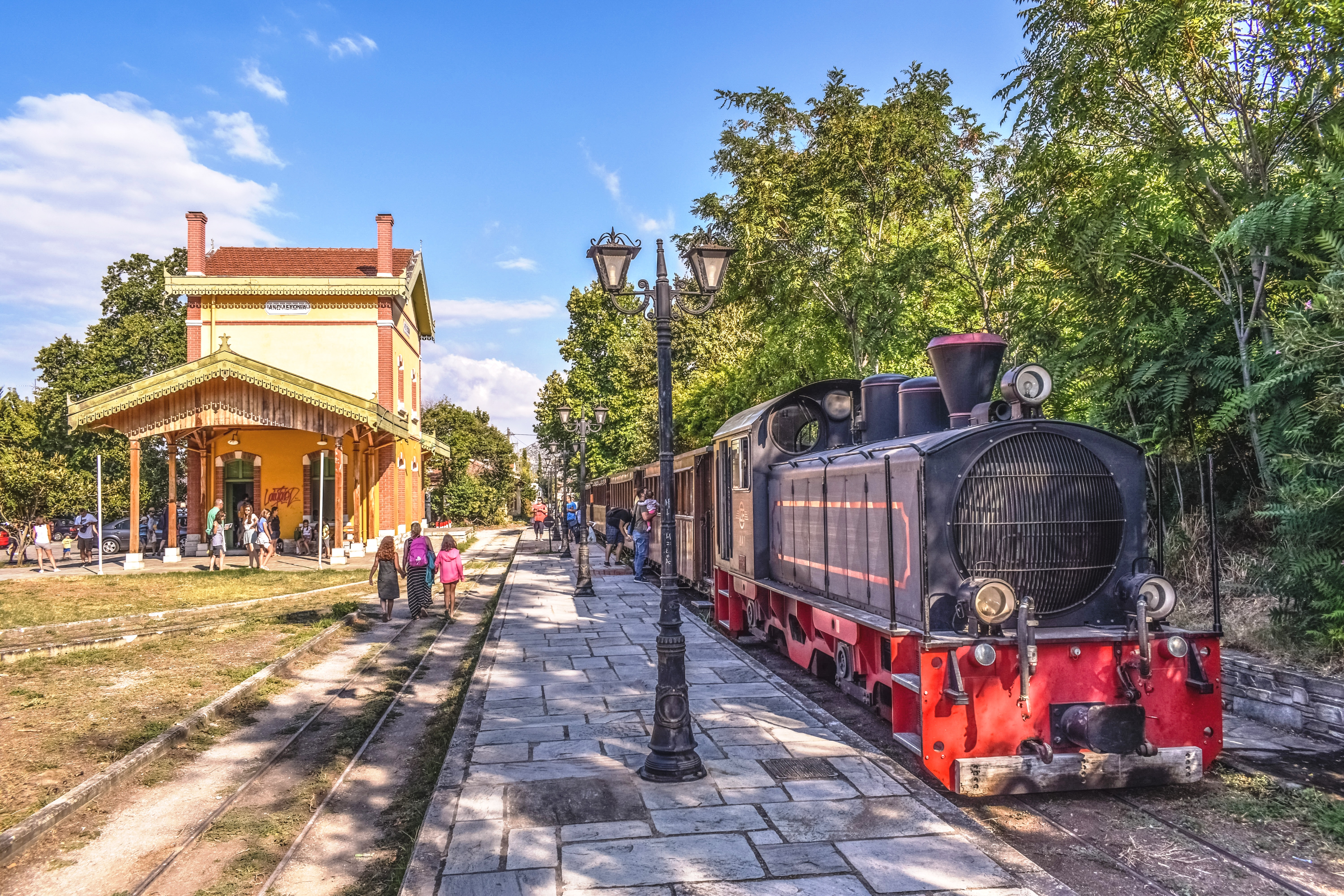
Ano Lechonia railway station

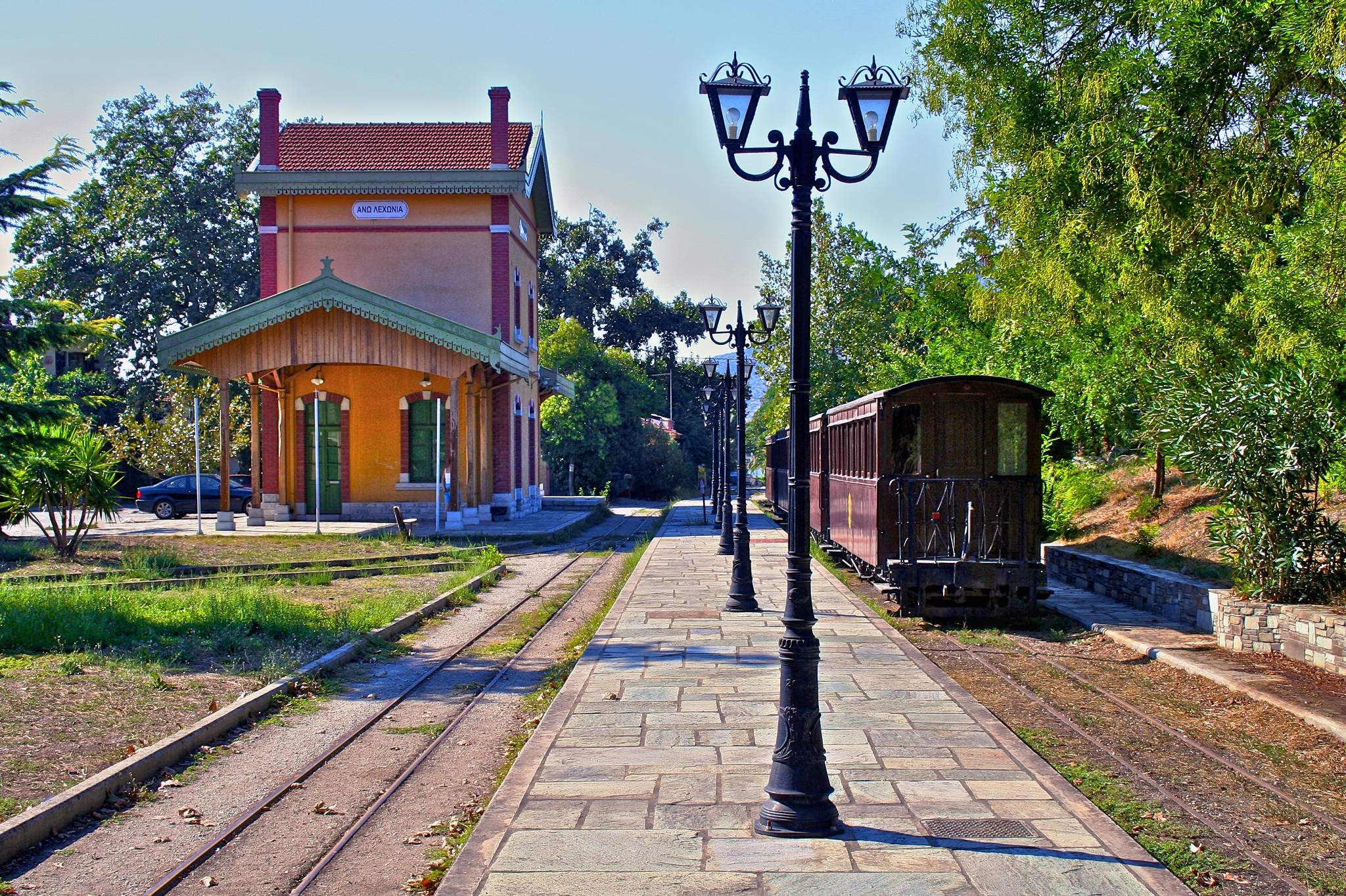
Ano Lechonia railway station

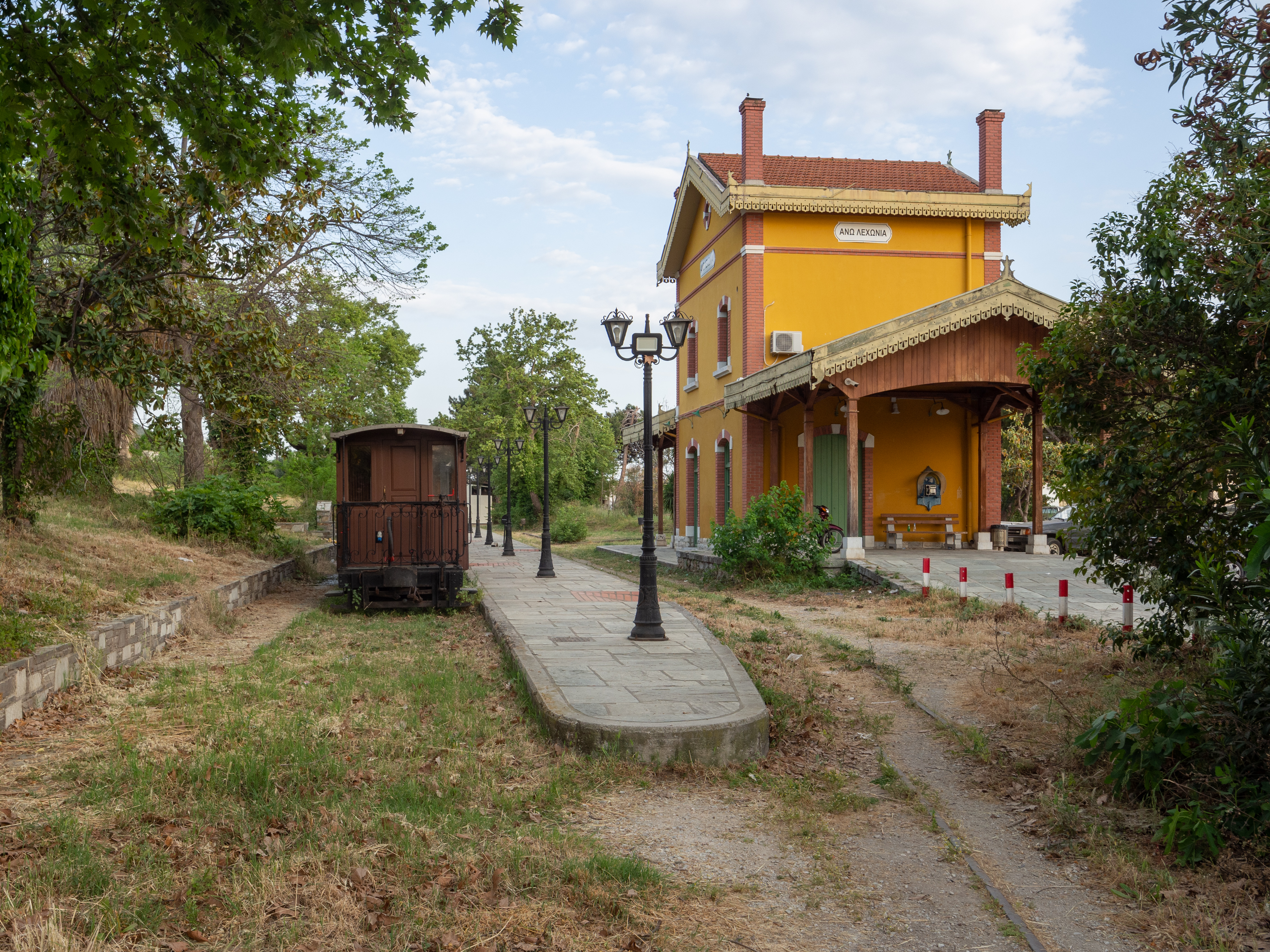
Ano Lechonia railway station

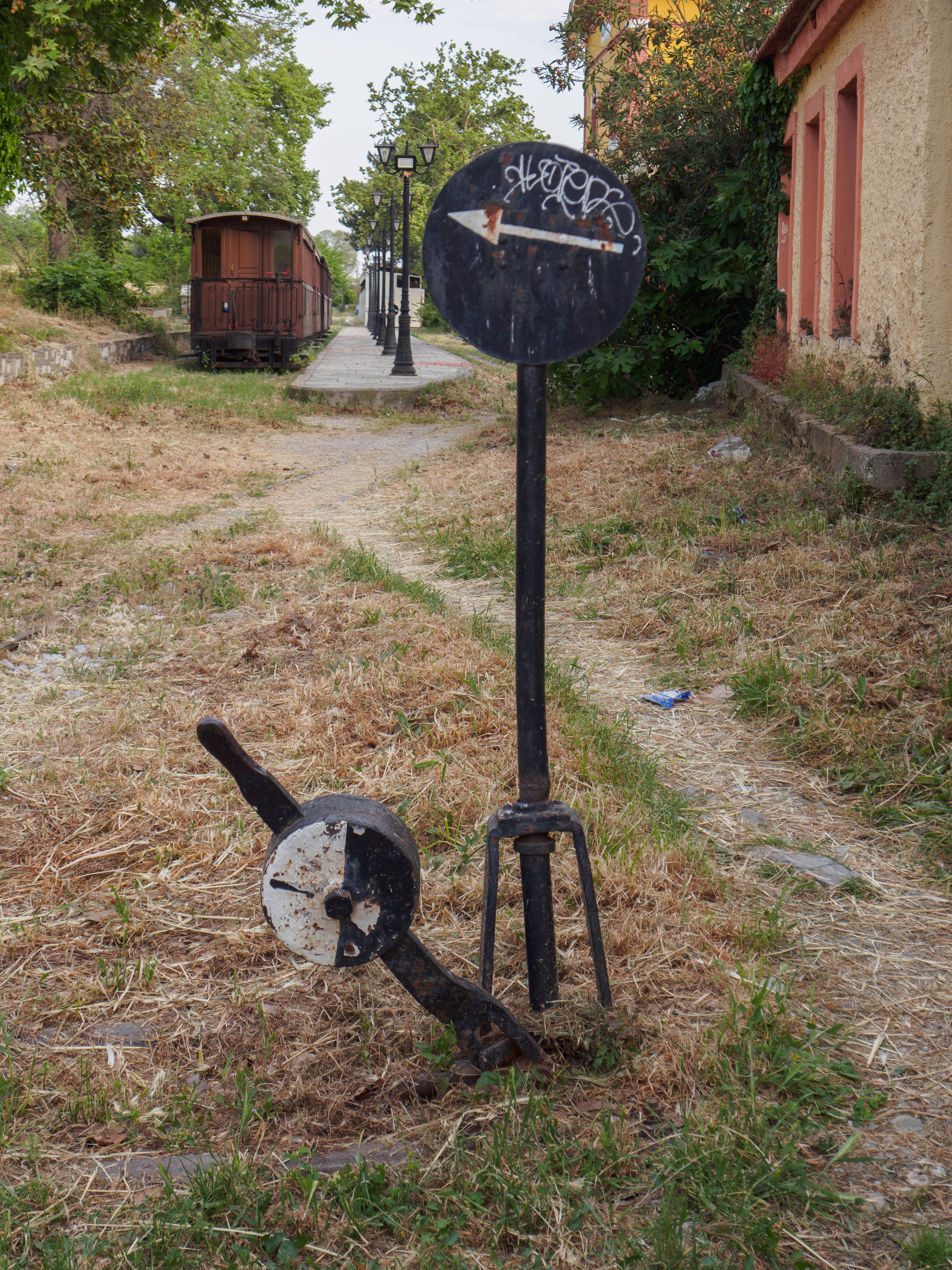
Ano Lechonia railway station

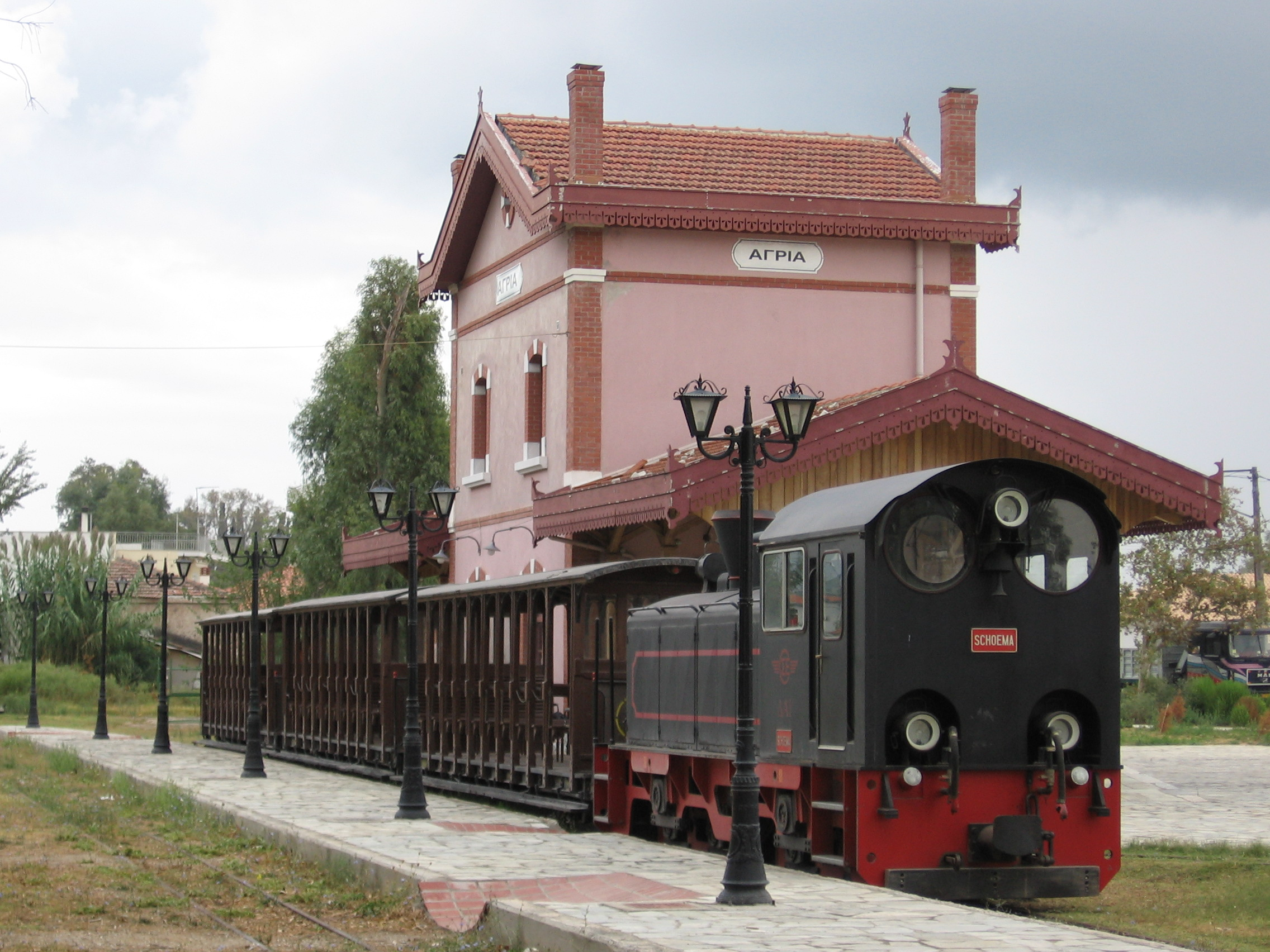
Agria railway station in 2006

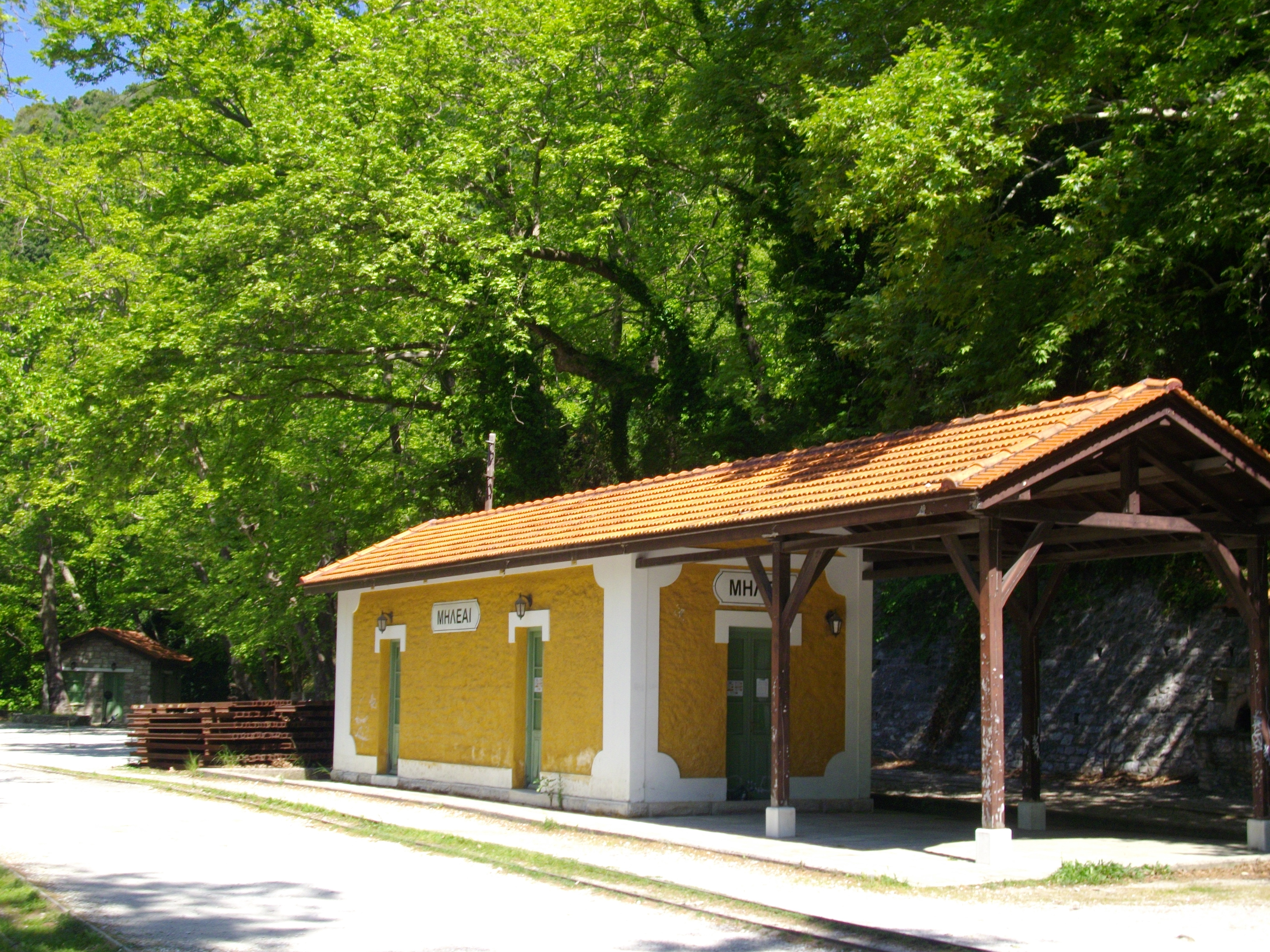
Millie railway station building

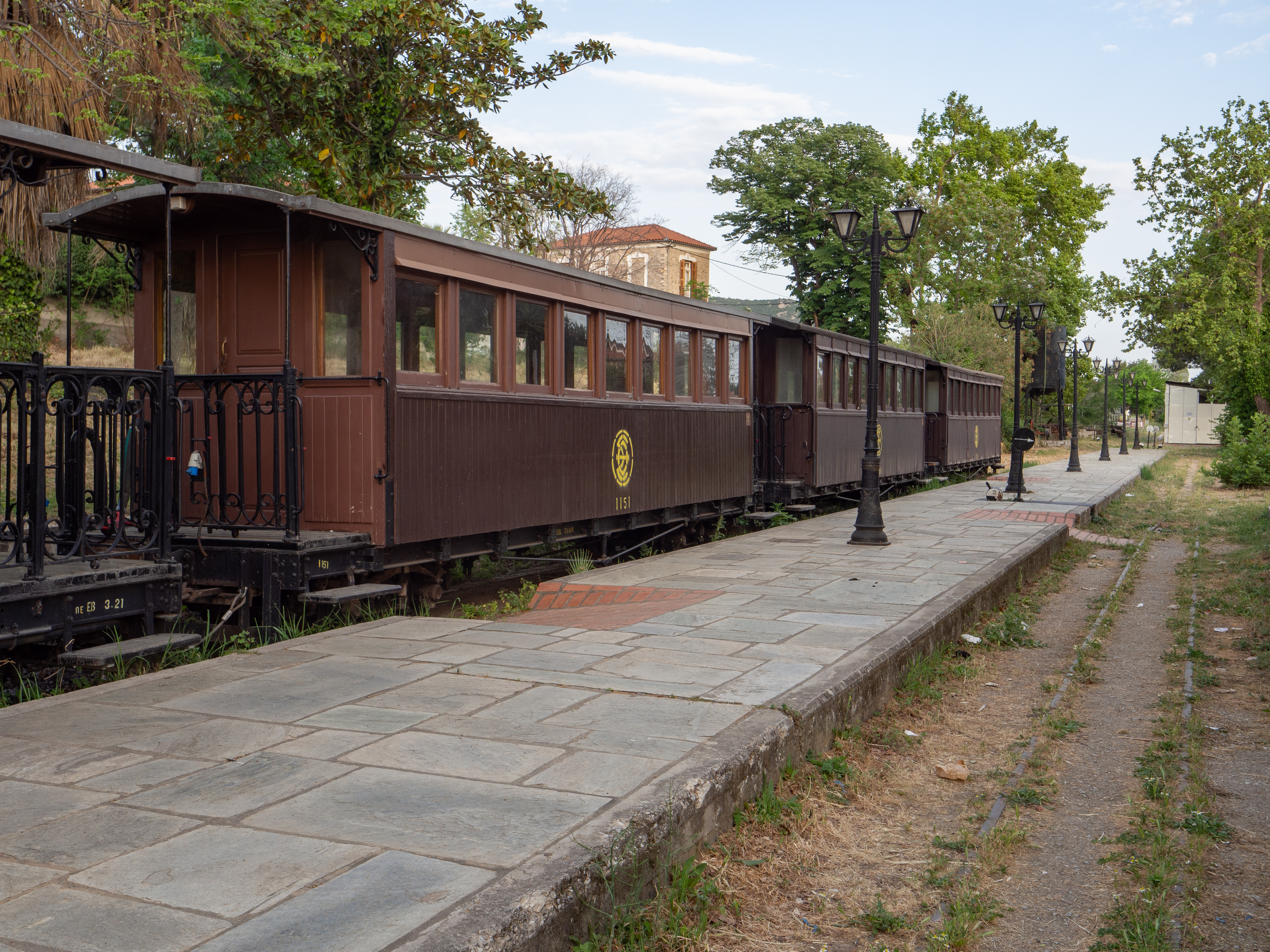
Ano Lechonia railway station

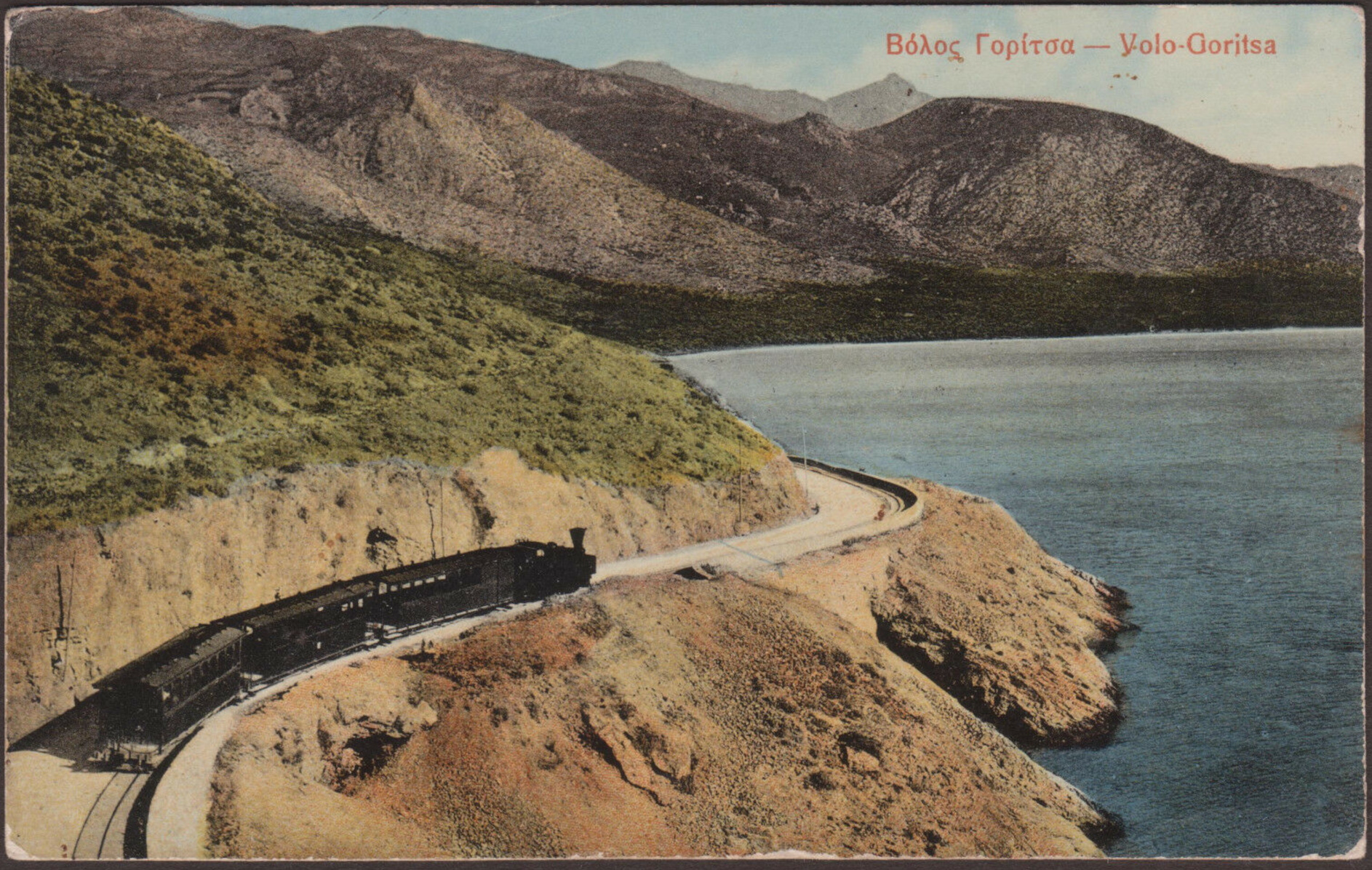
Postcard from 1913

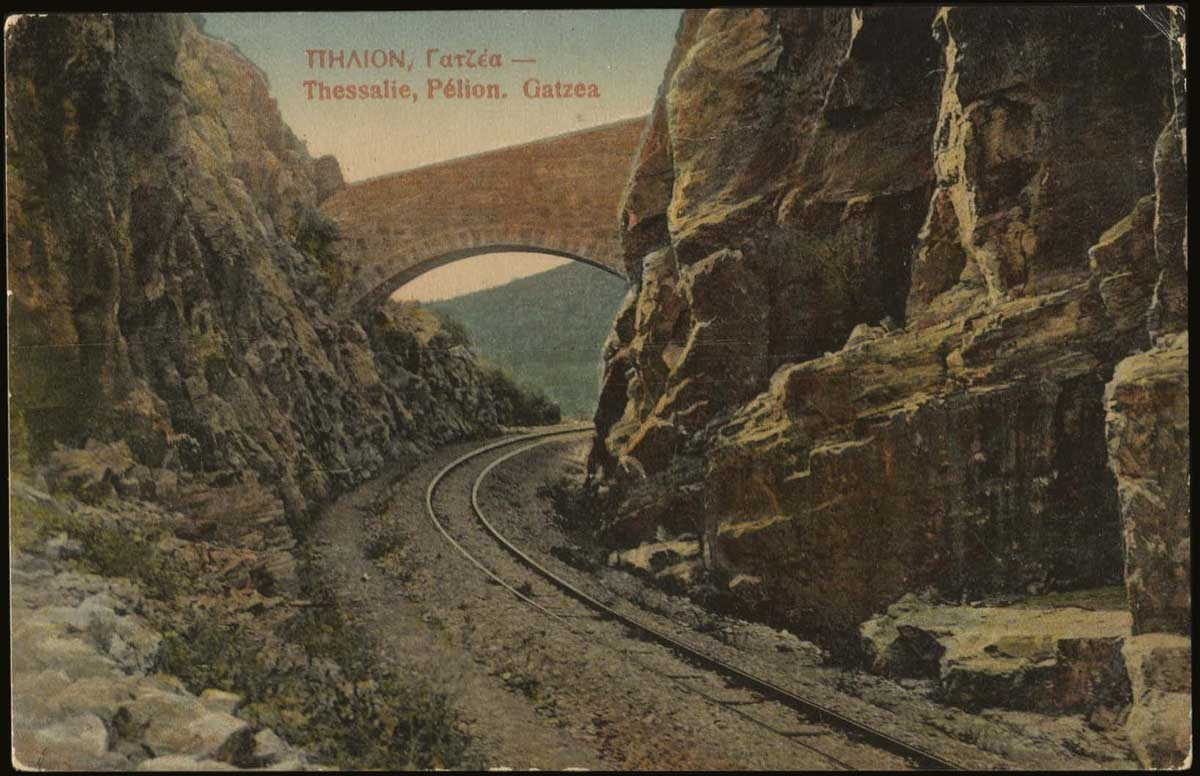
Postcard from 1906

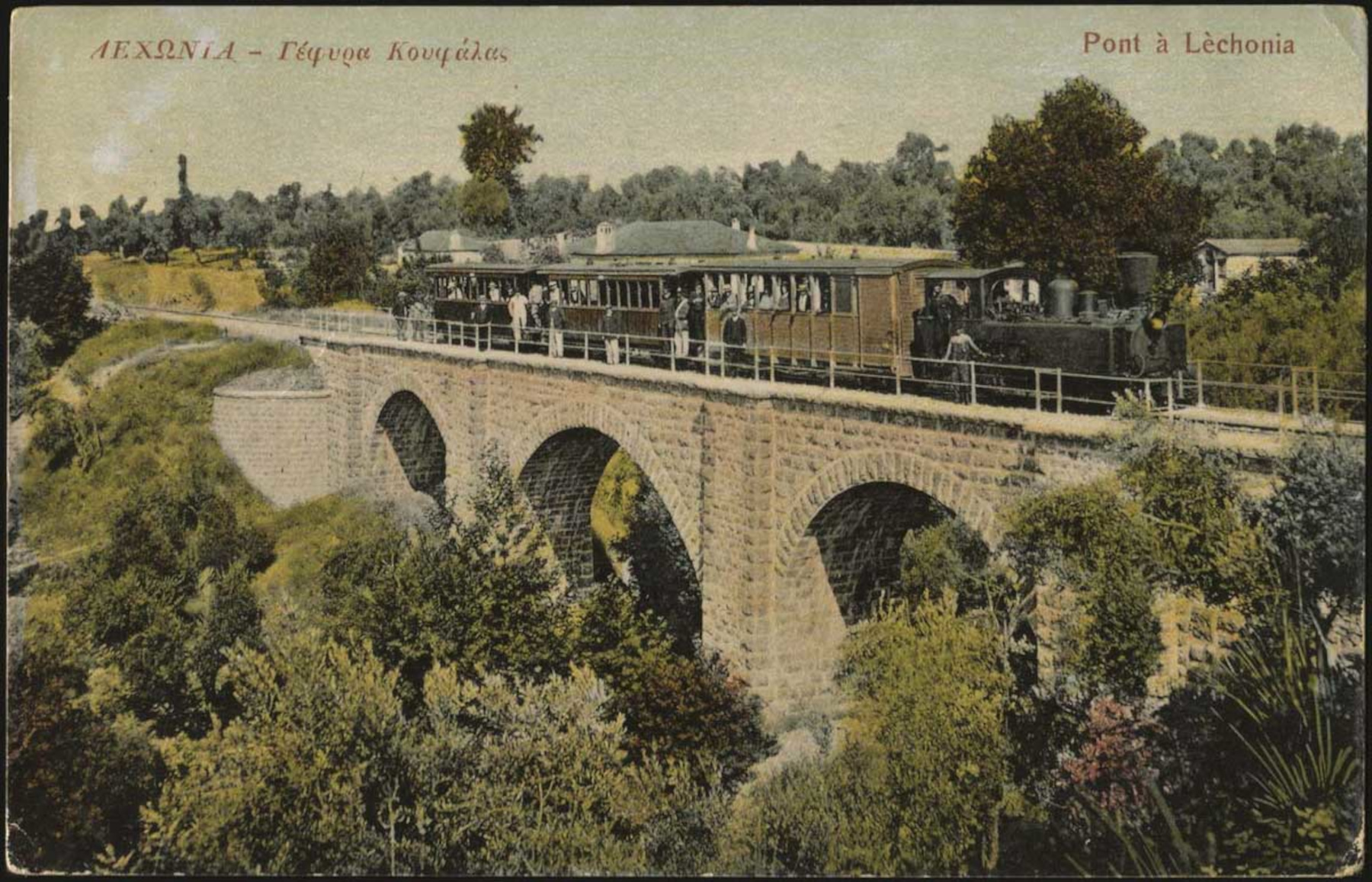
Postcard from 1906

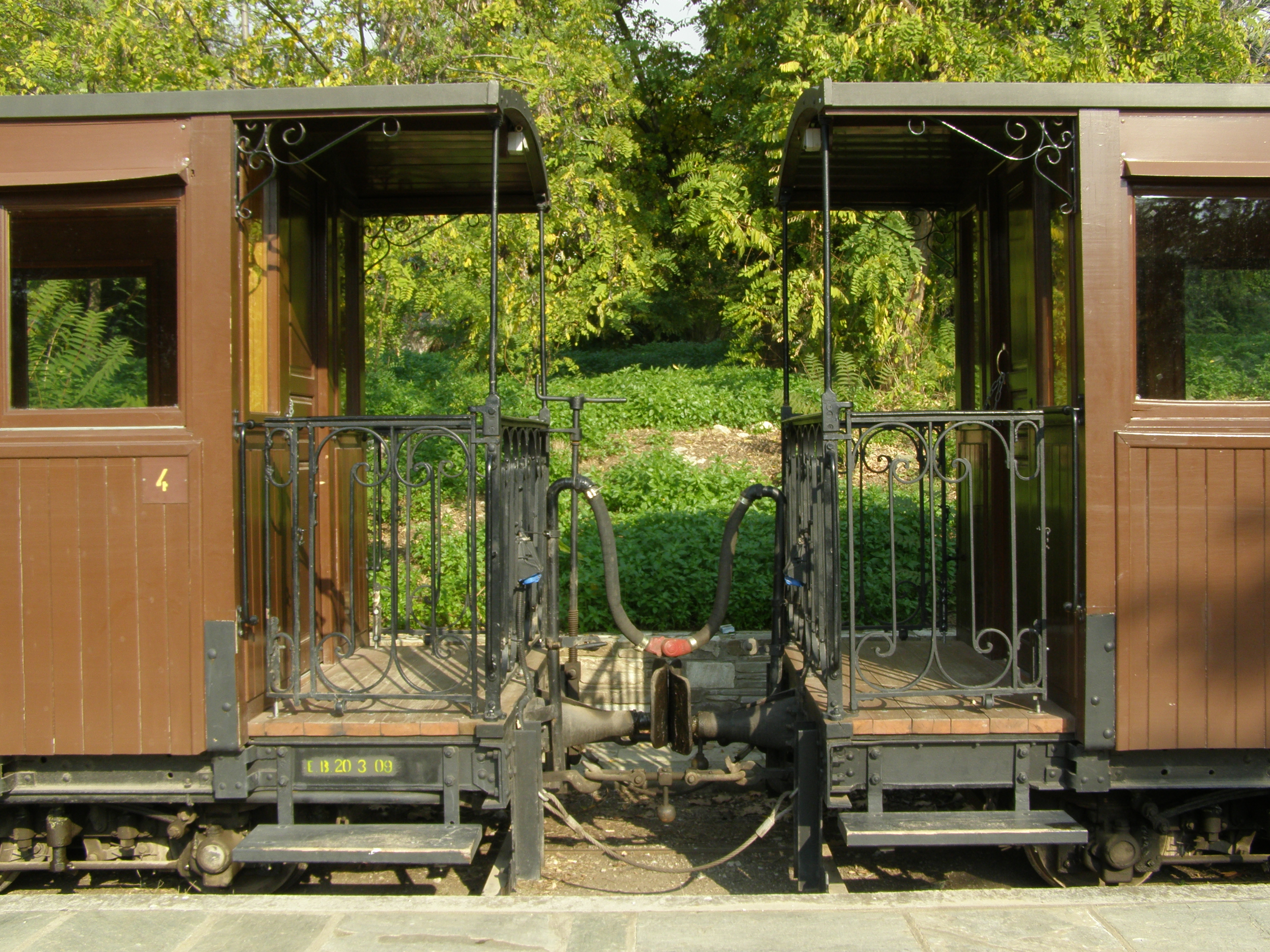
Rolling stock in modern times

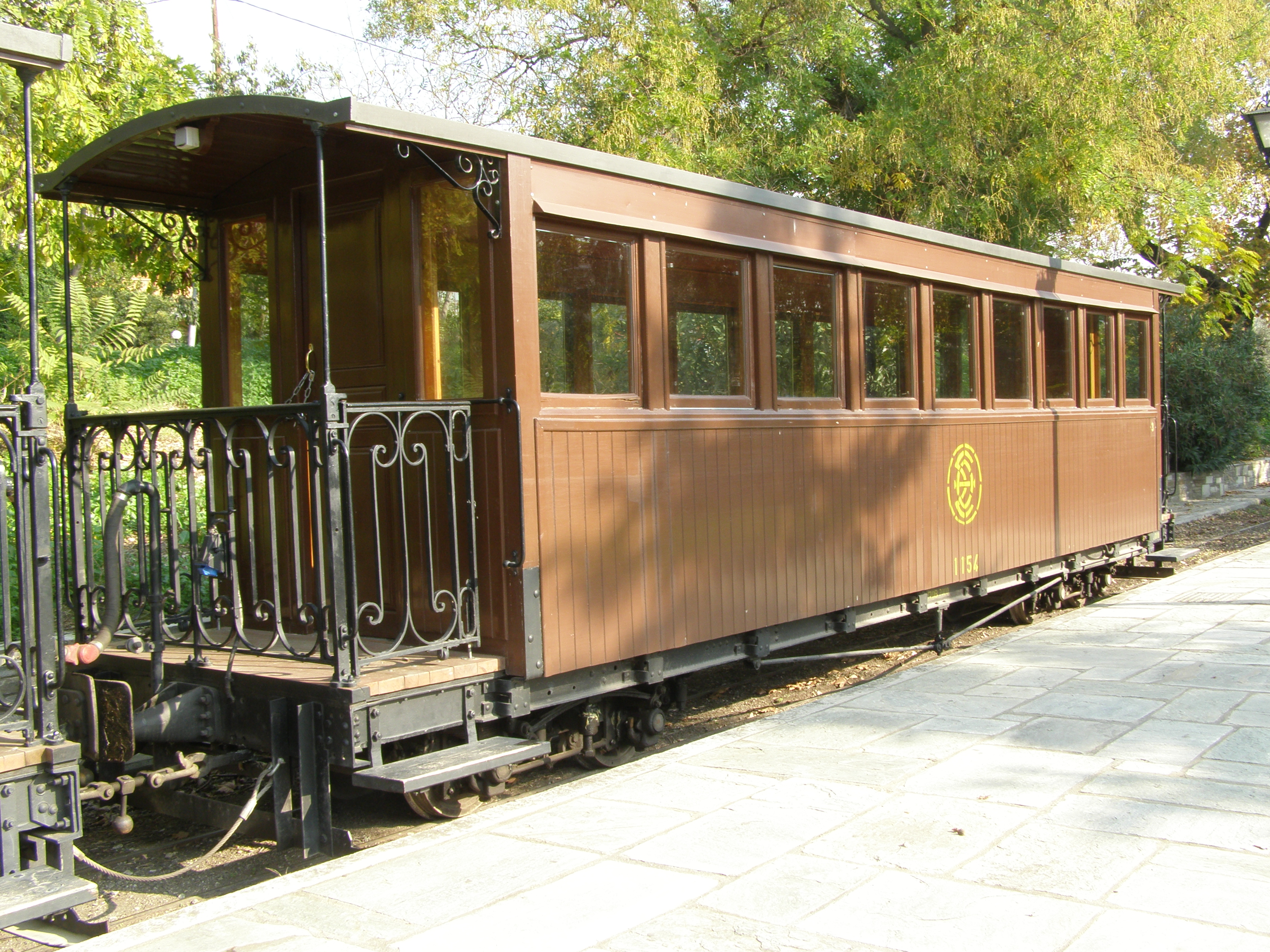
Rolling stock in modern times

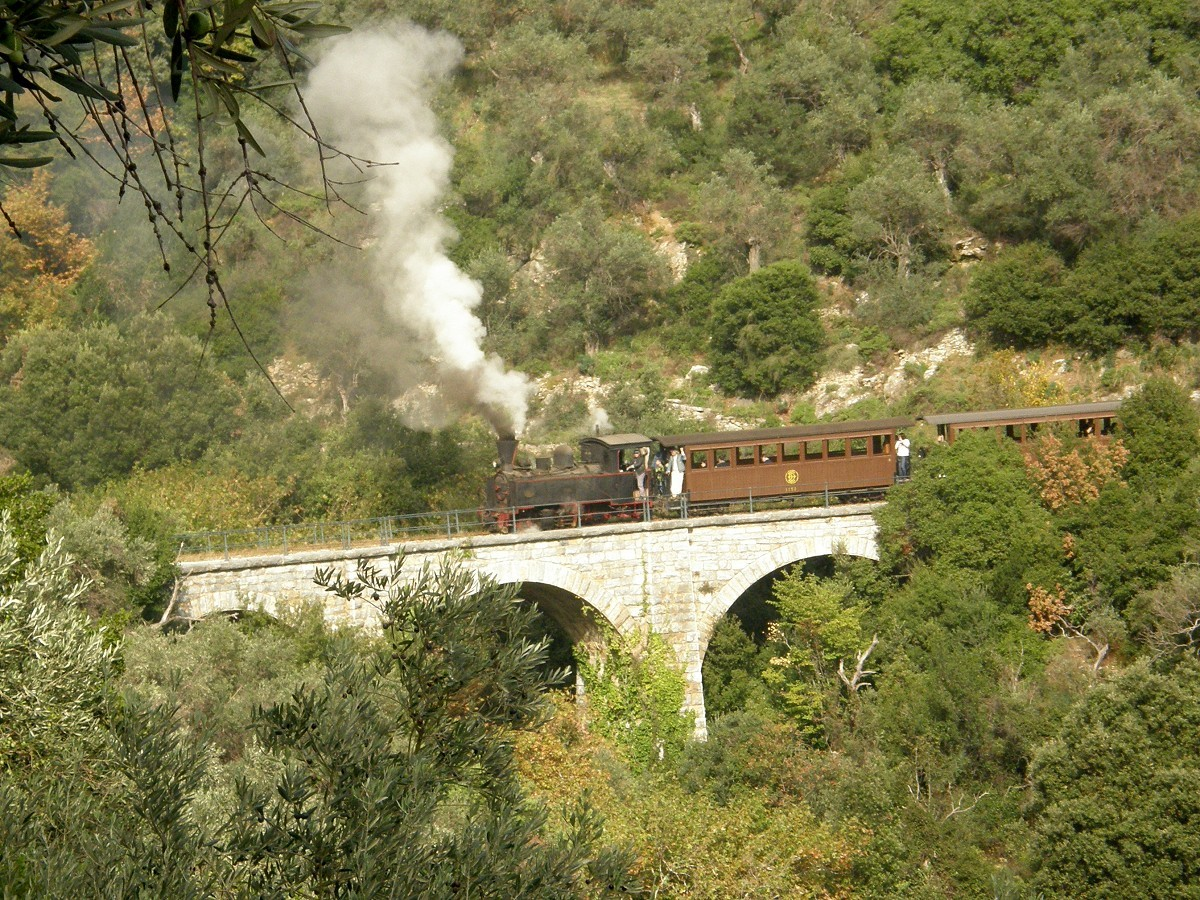
Pelion Railway train passing a bridge in 2008

== See also ==
- Thessaly Railways

== External links and further reading ==
- Media related to Pelion railway at Wikimedia Commons
- Hans-Bernhard Schönborn (1997). Schmalspurbahnen in Griechenland. Edition Ergasias. pp. 201–205, 228, 241–242, 252. ISBN 3-909221-32-7.
- George Nathenas; Militsa Karathanou (2006). The Little Train of Pelion. Athens: Militos Editions. ISBN 960-8460-68-9.
- Greece – Railway Map (2nd ed.). London, UK: The Quail Map Company. 1992. ISBN 0-900609-85-0.
- Simms, W.F. (1997). The railways of Greece. Wilfried F. Sims. pp. 12, 79. ISBN 0-9528881-1-4.
- Pelion railway at science.gr
- The Railways of Volos by James Waite (The International Steam pages, 2010).
