= Nikolaos Pavlopoulos =

Greek sculptor and writer

Nikolaos Pavlopoulos (Greek: Νικόλαος Παυλόπουλος, Agios Georgios Nileias, 1909 - Athens, October 10, 1990) was a Greek sculptor and writer. His education in his years in Volos, he learned himself with calligraphy, music and theatre. When he finished at the Practical Lyceum at Volos, he moved to Athens where he became a sculptor at the school where his teacher was Thomas Thomopoulos. He was an academic wood and marble sculptor. Works that had presented in Greece and around the world (London, Washington D.C., Montreal, Tokyo, Sydney, etc.). He was awarded at international event which happened in Paris, Rome, Florence, etc. After his death, the "Sculptor Nicolas Public Museum" is named after himself which features some of his great works.
