= Agios Georgios Nileias =

Agios Georgios Nileias Άγιος Γεώργιος Νηλείας
- Community
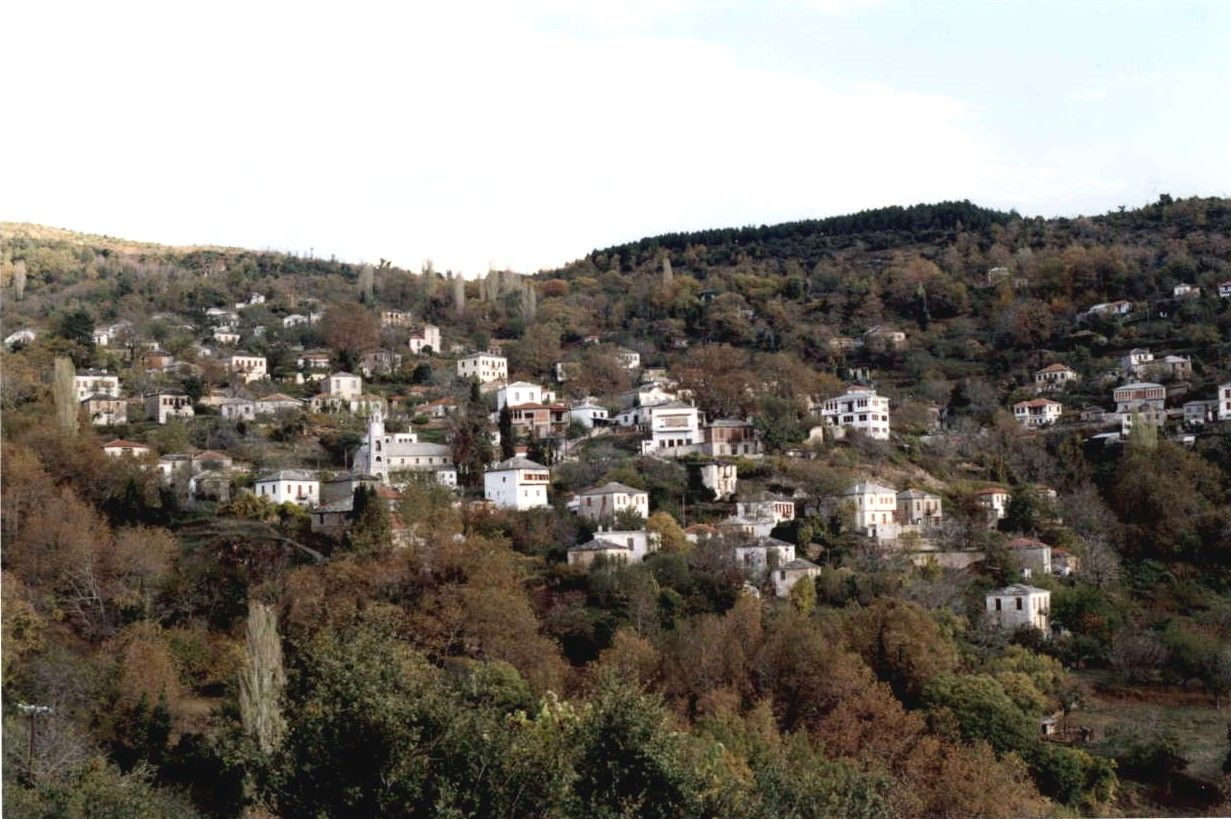

- Location within Greece
- Coordinates: 39°21′N 23°05′E
- Country: Greece
- Administrative region: Thessaly
- Regional unit: Magnesia
- Municipality: South Pelion
- Municipal unit: Milies

Population (2021)
  - Community: 922
- Time zone: UTC+2 (EET)
  - Summer (DST): UTC+3 (EEST)
- Vehicle registration: ΒΟ

Agios Georgios Nileias (Greek: Άγιος Γεώργιος Νηλείας) is a village and a community in the municipal unit of Milies, Magnesia, Greece. It is situated on the slopes of mount Pelion, at about 700 m elevation. Agios Georgios Nileias is 1.5 km east of Agios Vlasios, 3 km northwest of Pinakates, 6 km northwest of Milies and 13 km east of Volos. Agios Georgios Nileias has a municipal museum with works of the sculptor Nikolaos Pavlopoulos.

== Subdivisions ==
The community Agios Georgios Nileias consists of the following villages:

- Agios Georgios, elevation: 700 m, population as of 2021: 164 (population of 1971: 109)
- Agia Triada, elevation: 500 m, pop.: 111 (pop. 1971: 263)
- Ano Gatzea, elevation: 150 m, pop.: 250 (pop. 1971: 382)
- Dyo Revmata, elevation: 500 m, pop.: 15 (pop. 1971: unknown)
- Kato Gatzea, seaside settlement, pop.: 382 (pop. 1971: 324)

== Population ==
Year	Population village	Community population
1881	-	1,869
1971	109	1,078
1991	-	1,243
1991	161	-
2001	179	1,092
2011	142	963
2021	164	922

== History ==
According to tradition, the village was founded by shepherds who found an icon in a bush. Its inhabitants lived in the village in the summer and in the winter they moved to villages at lower elevations, such as Agia Triada, Ano Gatzea and Kato Gatzea. The village revolted during the Greek War of Independence of 1821, but the revolt was suppressed by the Ottoman Pasha Dramali and the village was burnt. Agios Georgios joined the rest of Greece in 1881. The village became a part of the municipality of Nileia (named after the ancient city Nelia, located close to modern Volos), which was dissolved in 1914. Agios Georgios Nileias was an independent community from 1914 until 1998, when it became part of the municipality Milies.

== Notable people ==
- Yiannis Poulakas (1863–1942) painter
- Nikolaos Pavlopoulos (1909–1990) sculptor and writer

== See also ==
- List of settlements in the Magnesia regional unit
