= Scroll =

Roll of papyrus, parchment, or paper

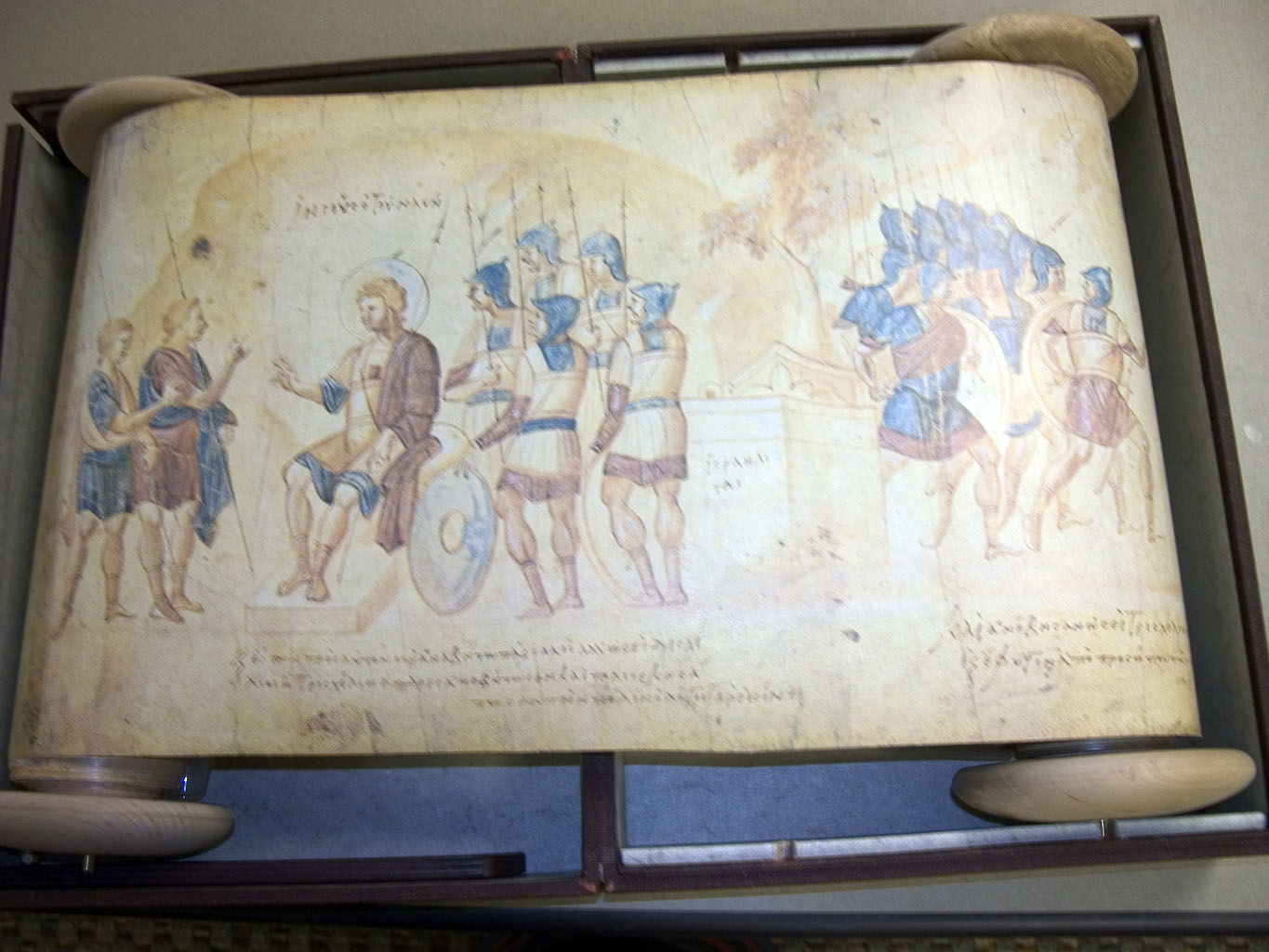
The Joshua Roll, Vatican Library. An illuminated scroll, probably of the 10th century, created in the Byzantine Empire.

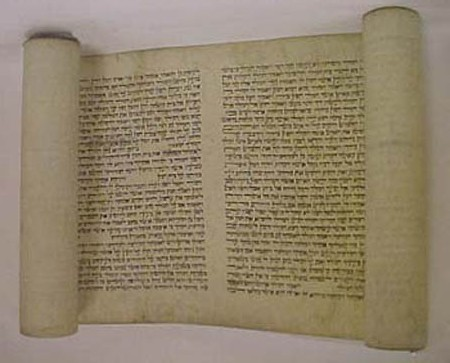
Scroll of the Book of Esther, Seville, Spain

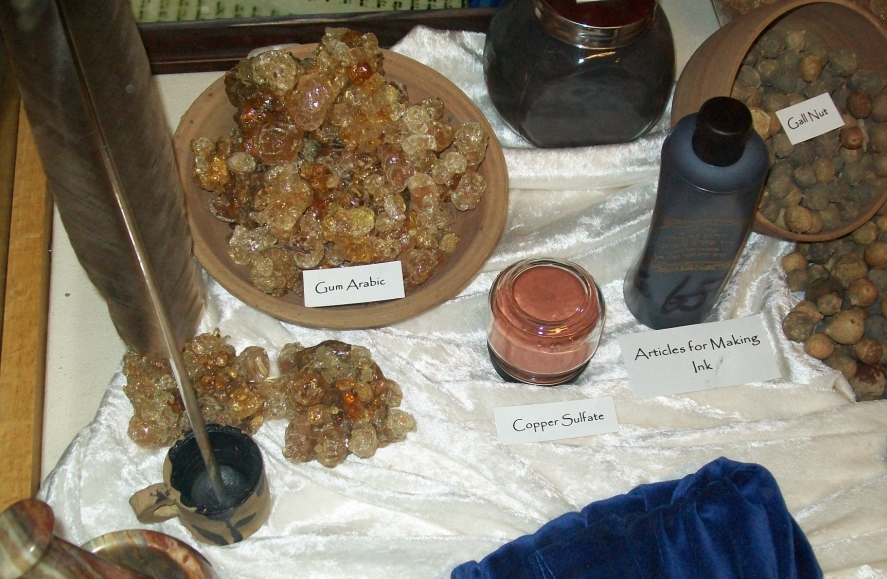
Ingredients used in making ink for Hebrew scrolls today

A scroll (from Old French: escroe or escroue), also known as a roll, is a roll of papyrus, parchment, or paper containing writing.

== Structure ==
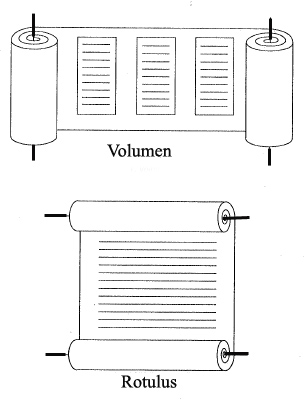
Volumen and Rotulus, two types of scrolls

A scroll is usually partitioned into pages, which are sometimes separate sheets of papyrus or parchment glued together at the edges. Scrolls may be marked divisions of a continuous roll of writing material. The scroll is usually unrolled so that one page is exposed at a time, for writing or reading, with the remaining pages rolled and stowed to the left and right of the visible page. Text is written in lines from the top to the bottom of the page. Depending on the language, the letters may be written left to right, right to left, or alternating in direction (boustrophedon).

== History ==
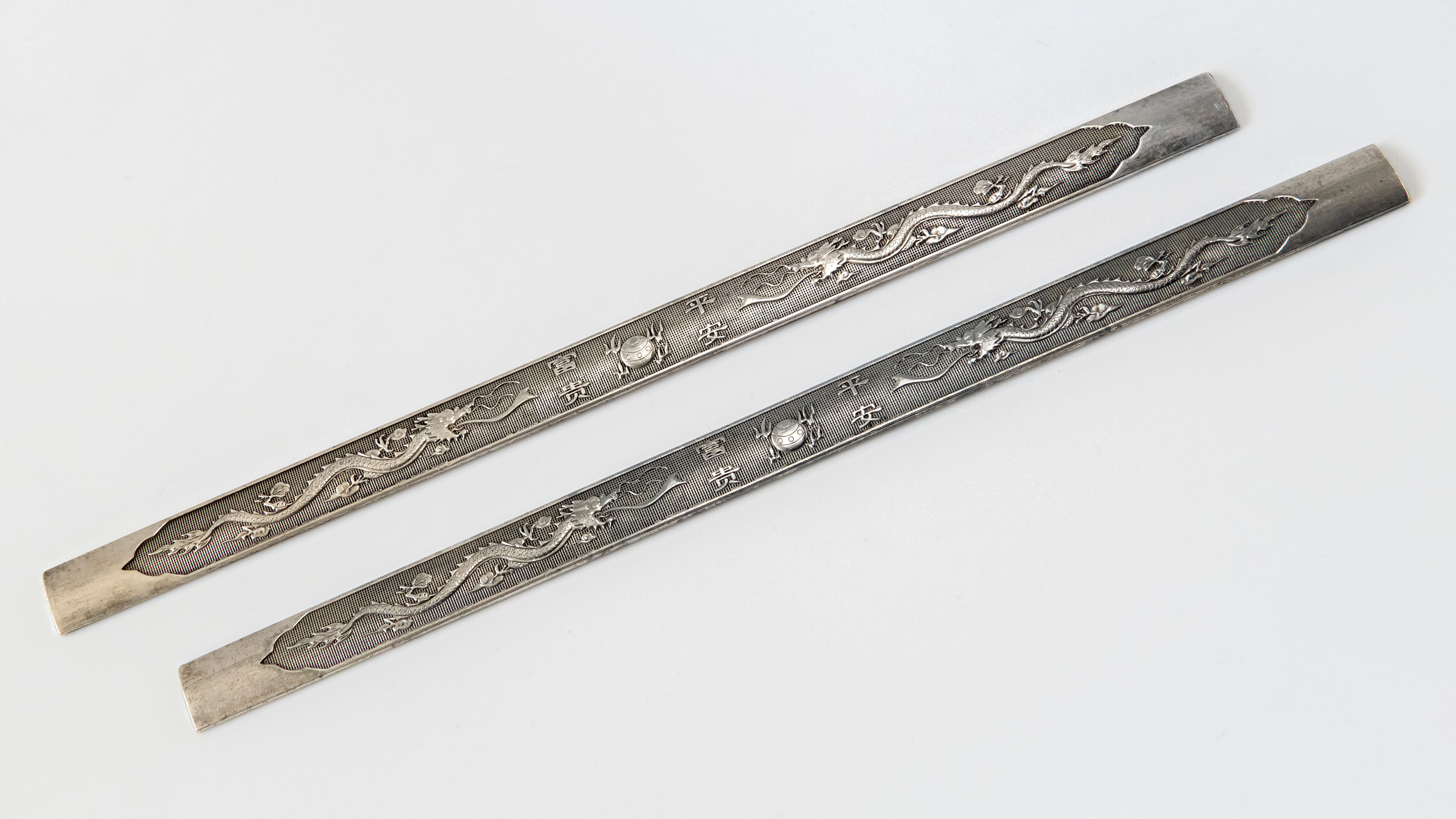
Chinese silver scroll weights embossed with dragons, used to stabilize scrolls when unrolled for viewing.

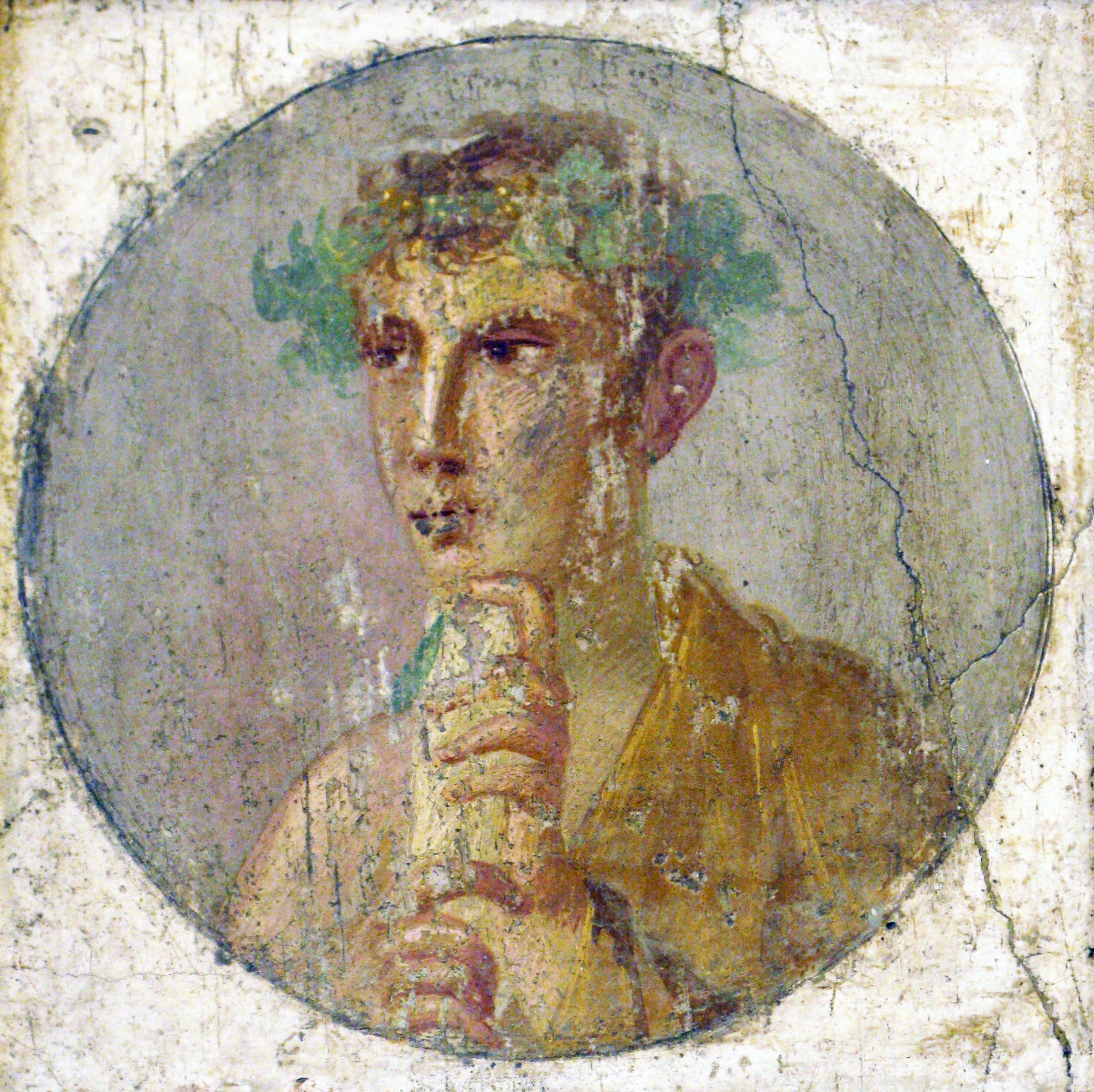
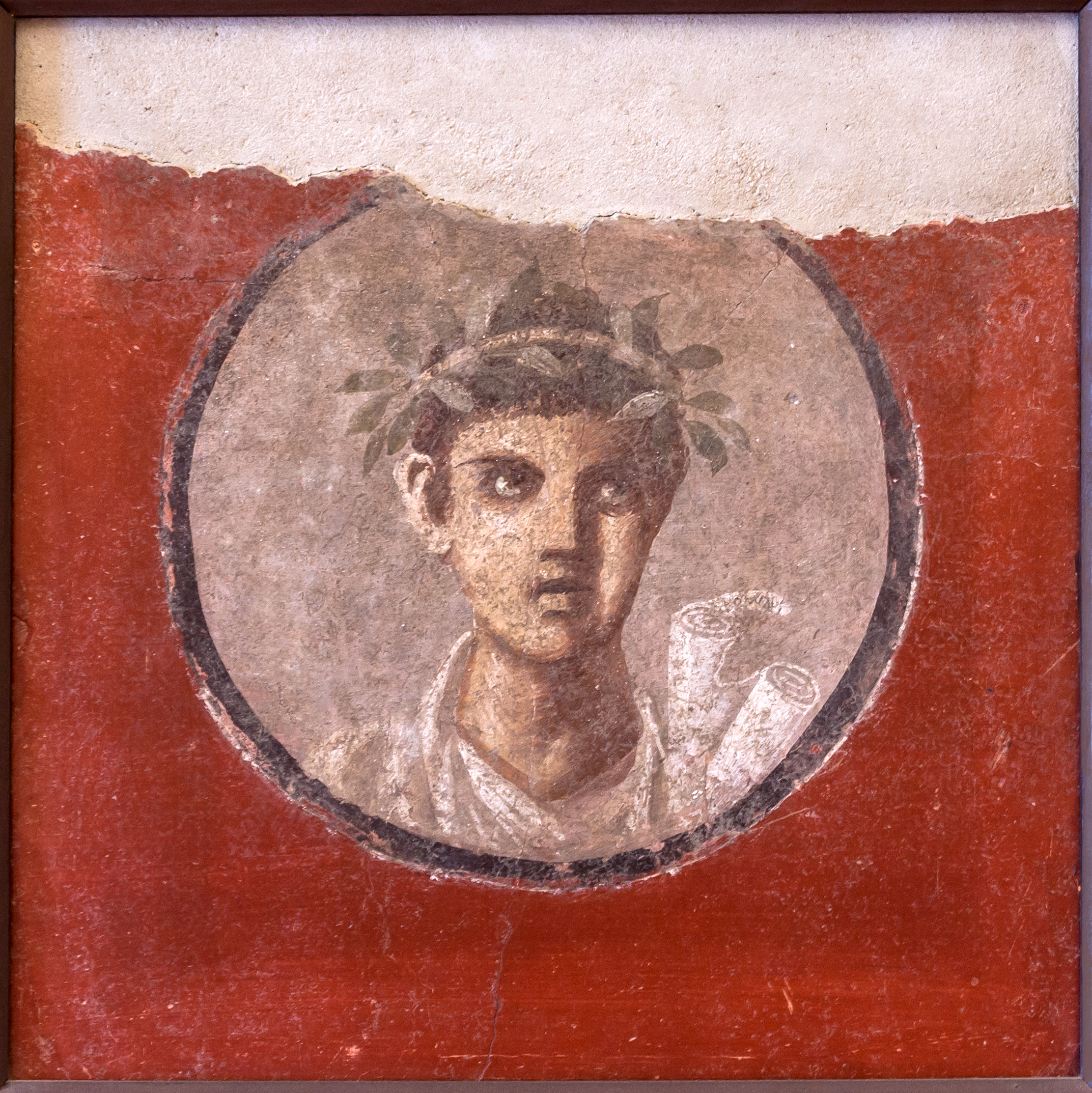
Roman portraiture frescos from Pompeii, 1st century AD, depicting two different men wearing laurel wreaths, one holding the rotulus, the other a volumen

Scrolls were the first form of editable record keeping texts, used in Eastern Mediterranean ancient Egyptian civilizations. Parchment scrolls were used by the Israelites among others before the codex or bound book with parchment pages was invented by the Romans, which became popular around the 1st century AD. Scrolls were more highly regarded than codices until well into Roman times.

The ink used in writing scrolls had to adhere to a surface that was rolled and unrolled, so special inks were developed. Even so, ink would slowly flake off scrolls.

== Rolls ==
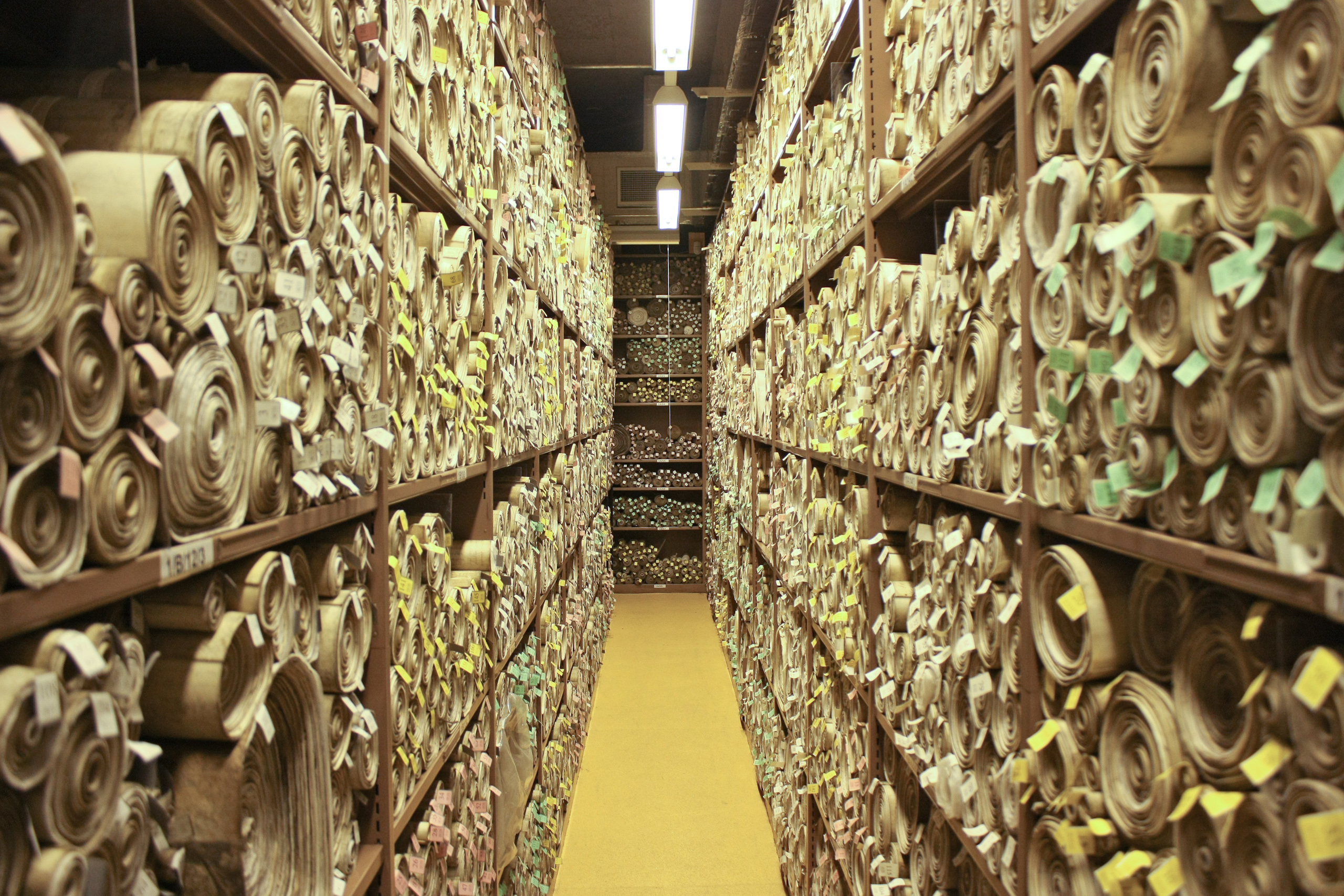
Rolls recording UK Acts of Parliament held in the Parliamentary Archives, Palace of Westminster, London

Shorter pieces of parchment or paper are called rolls or rotuli, although usage of the term by modern historians varies with periods. Historians of the classical period tend to use roll instead of scroll. Rolls may still be many meters or feet long, and were used in the medieval and Early Modern period in Europe and various West Asian cultures for administrative manuscript documents intended for various uses, including accounting, rent-rolls, legal agreements, and inventories. A distinction that sometimes applies is that the lines of writing in rotuli run across the width of the roll (that is to say, are parallel with any unrolled portion) rather than along the length, divided into page-like sections. Rolls may be wider than most scrolls, up to perhaps 60 cm or two feet wide. Rolls were often stored together in a special cupboard on shelves.

== Chinese "whirlwind book" ==
A special Chinese form of short book, called the "whirlwind book", consists of several pieces of paper bound at the top with bamboo and then rolled up.

== Scotland ==
In Scotland, the term scrow was used from about the 13th to the 17th centuries for scroll, writing, or documents in list or schedule form. There existed an office of Clerk of the Scrow (Rotulorum Clericus) meaning the Clerk of the Rolls or Clerk of the Register.

== Replacement by the codex ==
The codex form of the book—that is, folding a scroll into pages, which made reading and handling the document much easier—appears during the Roman period. Stemming from a passage in Suetonius' Divus Julius (56.6), legend has it that Julius Caesar was the first to fold scrolls, concertina-fashion, for dispatches to his forces campaigning in Gaul. But the precise meaning of the passage is by no means clear. As C. H. Roberts and T. C. Skeat point out, the idea that "Julius Caesar may have been the inventor of the codex... is indeed a fascinating proposition; but in view of the uncertainties surrounding the passage, it is doubtful whether any such conclusion can be drawn". What the evidence of surviving early codices does make clear is that Christians were among the earliest to make widespread use of the codex. Several Christian papyrus codices known to us date from the second century, including at least one generally accepted as being no later than A.D. 150. "All in all, it is impossible to believe that the Christian adoption of the codex can have taken place any later than circa A.D. 100 (it may, of course, have been earlier)". There were certainly practical reasons for the change. Scrolls were awkward to read if a reader wished to consult material at opposite ends of the document. Further, scrolls were written only on one side, while both sides of the codex page were used.

Eventually, the folds were cut into sheets, or "leaves", and bound together along one edge. The bound pages were protected by stiff covers, usually of wood enclosed with leather. Codex is Latin for a "block of wood": the Latin liber, the root of "library", and the German Buch, the source of "book", both refer to wood. The codex was not only easier to handle than the scroll, but it also fit conveniently on library shelves. The spine generally held the book's title, facing out, affording easier organization of the collection. The surface on which the ink was applied was kept flat, not subjected to weakening by the repeated bending and unbending that scrolls undergo as they are alternately rolled up for storage and unrolled for reading, which creates physical stresses in both the papyrus and the ink of scrolls.

The term codex technically refers only to manuscript books — those that, at one time, were handwritten. More specifically, a codex is the term used primarily for a bound manuscript from Roman times up through the Middle Ages.

From the fourth century on, the codex became the standard format for books, and scrolls were no longer generally used. After the contents of a parchment scroll were copied in codex format, the scroll was seldom preserved. The majority that did survive were found by archaeologists in burial pits and in the buried trash of forgotten communities.

== Modern technology ==
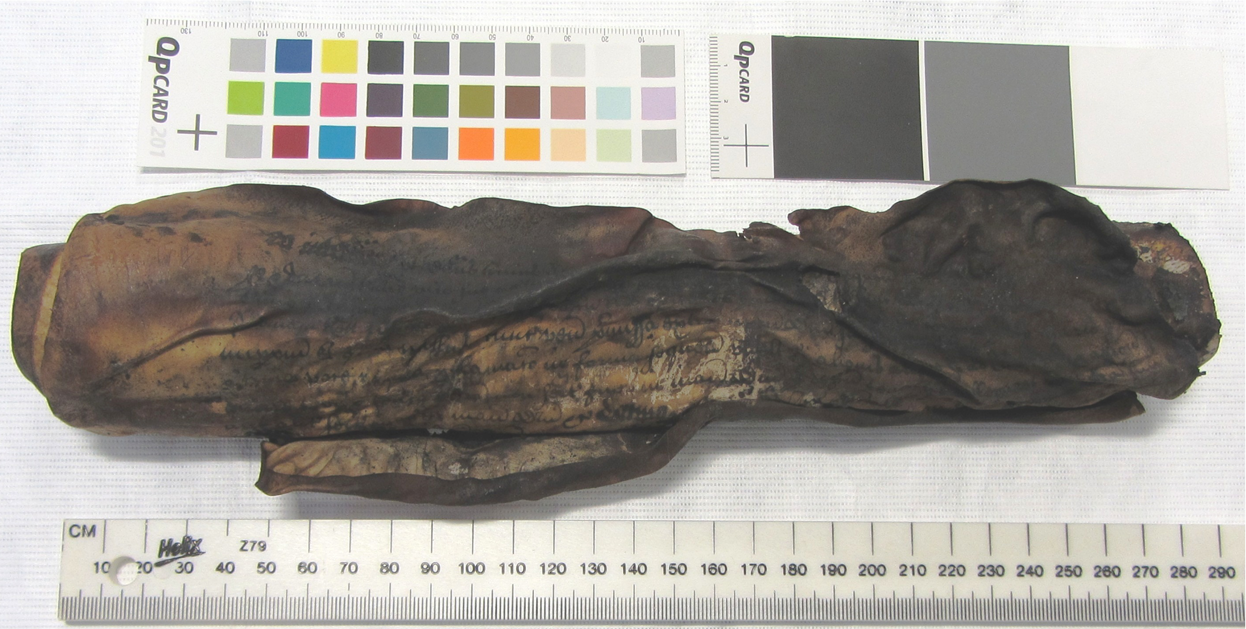
The 16th century Diss Heywood scroll, which is severely charred.

Virtual unfolding is a non-destructive method of unrolling and reading damaged or fragile scrolls. Unlike using physical unrolling which often destroys such scrolls, virtual unrolling starts with a 3D X-ray scan in a tomograph, which is later programmatically unrolled. The unrolled image then can be studied in detail and processed using machine learning methods. Virtual unrolling was used for the burned En-Gedi Scroll from Israel, for water-damaged Bressingham and burned Diss Heywood scrolls from England, for the Herculaneum papyri burned during the Pompeii volcano eruption, for a Mongolian Buddhist scroll, found inside a statue, for a metal scroll amulted from Jordan, unopen letters from Europe, and for bamboo scrolls from China.

== See also ==
- Speech scroll
- Hanging scroll
- Handscroll
- Herculaneum papyri
- Paleography
- Rotulus
- Vellum
- Woodblock printing
