= Virtual unfolding =

Non-destructive method of accessing scrolls

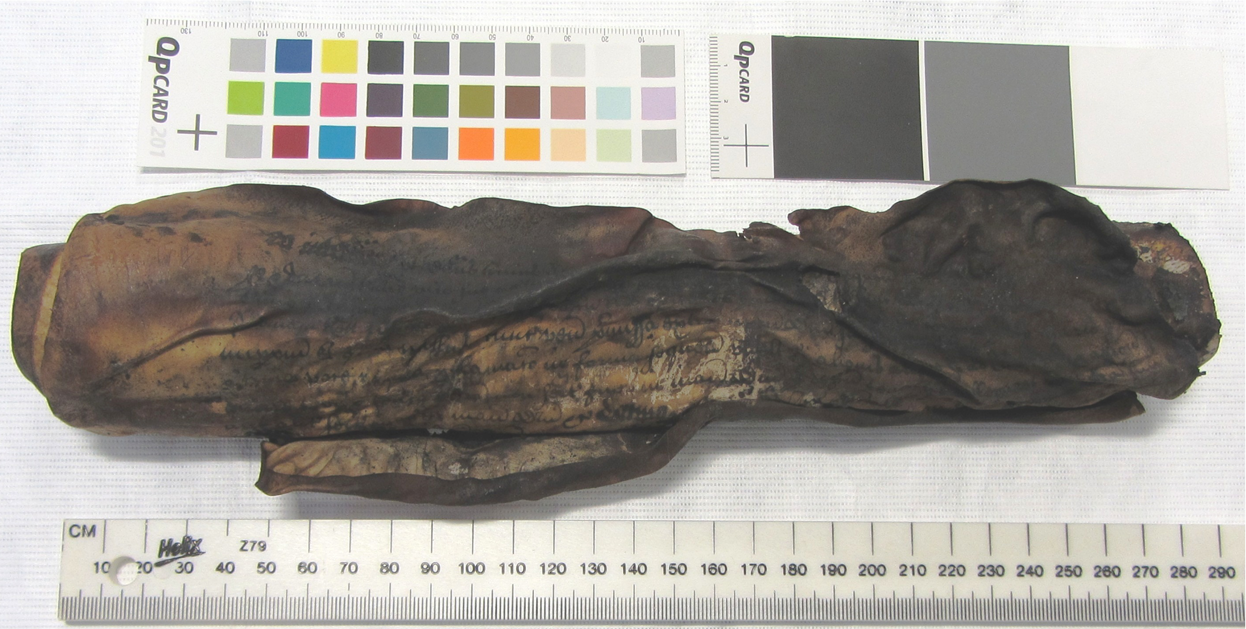
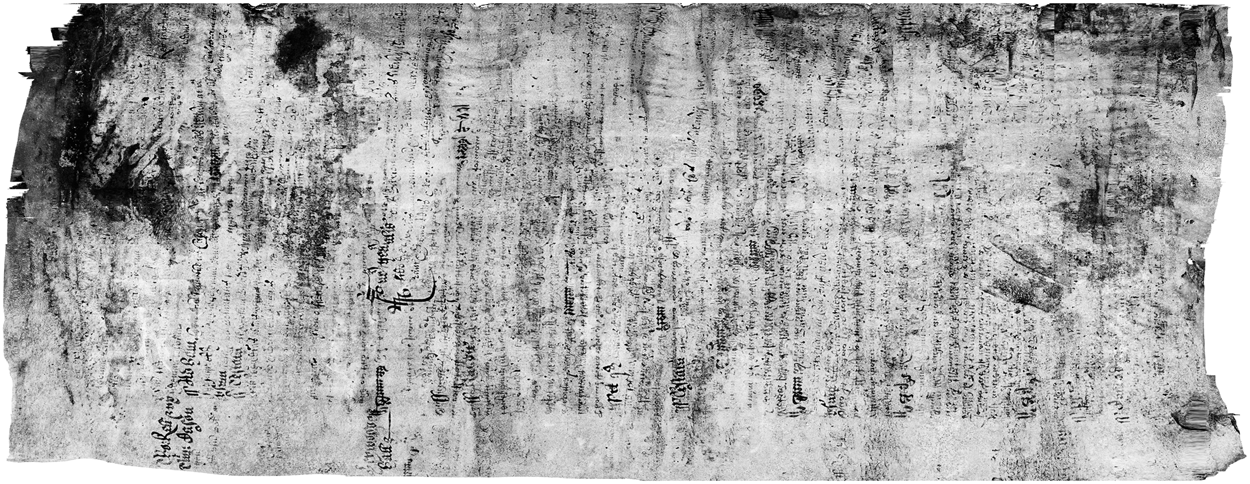
(Above) The 16th century Diss Heywood scroll, which is severely charred, and (below) the results of applying virtual unrolling to one of the sheets of the scroll.

Virtual unfolding, also known as virtual unrolling, virtual unwrapping, or virtual unravelling, is a non-destructive method of unrolling and reading damaged or fragile scrolls. Unlike physical unrolling (which often destroys such scrolls), virtual unrolling starts with a 3D X-ray scan in a tomograph, which is later programmatically unrolled. The unrolled image then can be studied in detail and processed using machine learning methods. Virtual unfolding was used for the burned En-Gedi Scroll from Israel, for water-damaged Bressingham and burned Diss Heywood scrolls from England, for the Herculaneum papyri burned during the Pompeii volcano eruption, for a Mongolian Buddhist scroll, found inside a statue, for a metal scroll amulet from Jordan, unopened letters from Europe, and for bamboo scrolls from China. The same method is used for battery degradation research.

Virtual unfolding is promoted and popularized by the Vesuvius Challenge, a competition to decipher Herculaneum scrolls.

== Method description ==
The virtual unrolling process begins with a volumetric scan of the damaged scroll using an X-ray tomograph. Such scans are non-invasive, and generate a virtual 3D model of the scroll in which ink can be distinguished from paper, because different elements absorb X-rays differently. After the scan, the unrolling process consists only of manipulation of the data, and the scroll is returned to the archive. This also allows researchers the flexibility to select scanning methods which yield the greatest contrast between ink and paper and to quickly adapt to improved scanning methods as they develop. In the case of the Herculaneum papyri, the volumetric scan used phase-contrast CT, while for the En-Gedi scroll micro-CT was used.

Different imaging techniques can be used, including computed tomography (X-CT), micro computed tomography (X-MCT), and phase-contrast tomography (X-PCT). Terahertz tomography was also proposed for cases where X-ray radiation is not acceptable.

This poses an obstacle to standard imaging techniques like CT scanning, which distinguish parts of an object according to their absorption and emission properties. However, the presence of ink at a particular point on the parchment results in the scroll being slightly thicker at that point than in its immediate vicinity. Consequently, suitability of a scanning technique for unrolling of the Herculaneum papyri depends largely on its ability to resolve this difference. Phase-contrast CT accomplishes this because radiation passing through a material will undergo a phase shift which depends on the material's thickness; however, micro-CT is also considered a suitable technique by virtue of its sheer resolution.

The virtual model produced by the scan records the composition of the scroll at an array of small regions called voxels or volume-pixels. The goal from this point is to construct a two-dimensional representation of the unrolled scroll in such a way that the voxels corresponding to points on the rolled-up scroll can be identified with corresponding pixels on the constructed unrolling. This process happens in three steps: segmentation, texturing and flattening.

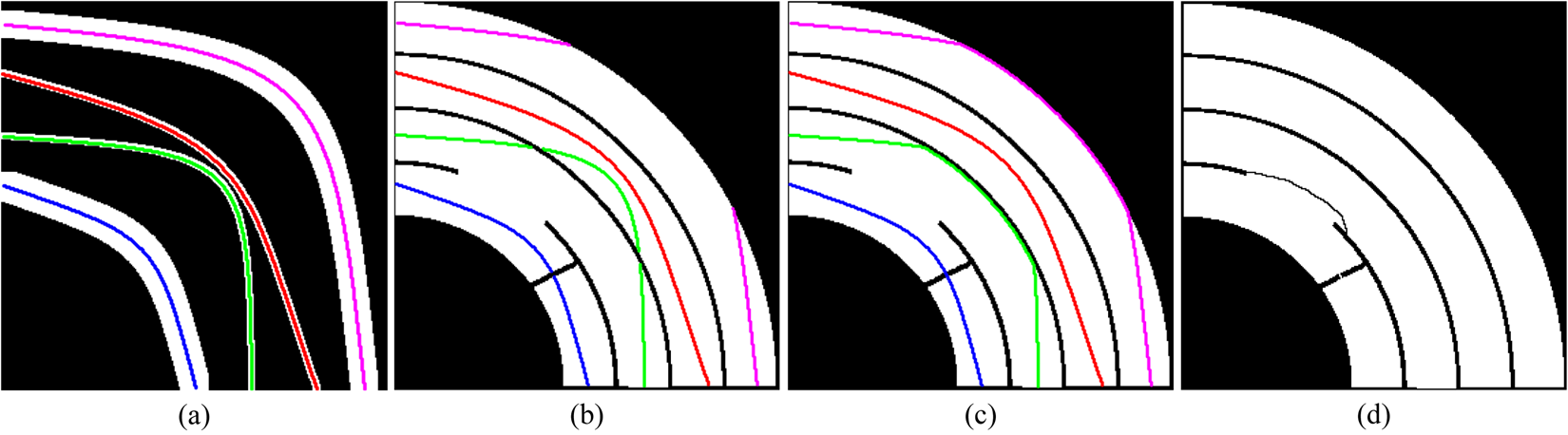
The layer connection for a parchment containing multiple sheets and the final segmentation result.

The segmentation step entails identifying geometric models for various pieces of the virtual scroll. Because of the extensive damage, the scroll is typically deformed and no longer has a clearly cylindrical geometry. Instead, some portions may look planar, some conical, some triangular, etc. Rather than modeling the complex geometry of an entire layer of the scroll, the segmentation process breaks each layer into components with simpler geometries, resulting in a piecewise model of the layer's overall geometry. The various components identified in this fashion can then be "peeled off" one at a time and unrolled according to their particular geometry. The pieces can then be reassembled at the end by reattaching their boundaries according to which voxels they contain (i.e. by ensuring that boundary voxels remain attached to their original neighbors in the result).

The texturing step then creates a texture map for each of the segments which were peeled off in the segmentation step by associating intensity values to its voxels. To do this, the voxels of a given segment are first identified with the corresponding voxels in the original 3D model, and an intensity value is then computed from the material composition recorded for that voxel by the volumetric scan. Due to occasional imprecision in the segmentation process, the voxel-mapping between segments and the original 3D model cannot always be done perfectly; in such cases, the procedure often includes nearest-neighbor interpolation texture filtering to minimize any noise this might introduce to the final texture. From the X-ray scan, each voxel has an associated brightness value that corresponds to a higher density. Since the metallic ink is denser than the carbon-based parchment, the ink will appear bright compared to the paper. After virtually peeling off the layers during the segmentation process, the texturing step matches the voxels of each geometric piece to their corresponding brightness value so that an observer is able to see the text written on each piece. The texturing process usually includes nearest-neighbor interpolation texture filtering to reduce the noise and sharpen the lettering.

After segmentation and texturing, each piece of the virtually deconstructed scroll is ordered and has its corresponding text visualized on its surface. This is, in theory, enough to read the scroll, but this representation is often further converted into a single 2D image to demonstrate what the scroll would look like if it could be physically unrolled. This entails a step that embeds the curved 3D segments into flat planes, producing 2D fragments which are merged to create a visualization of the unrolled papyrus as a whole.

== Inks ==
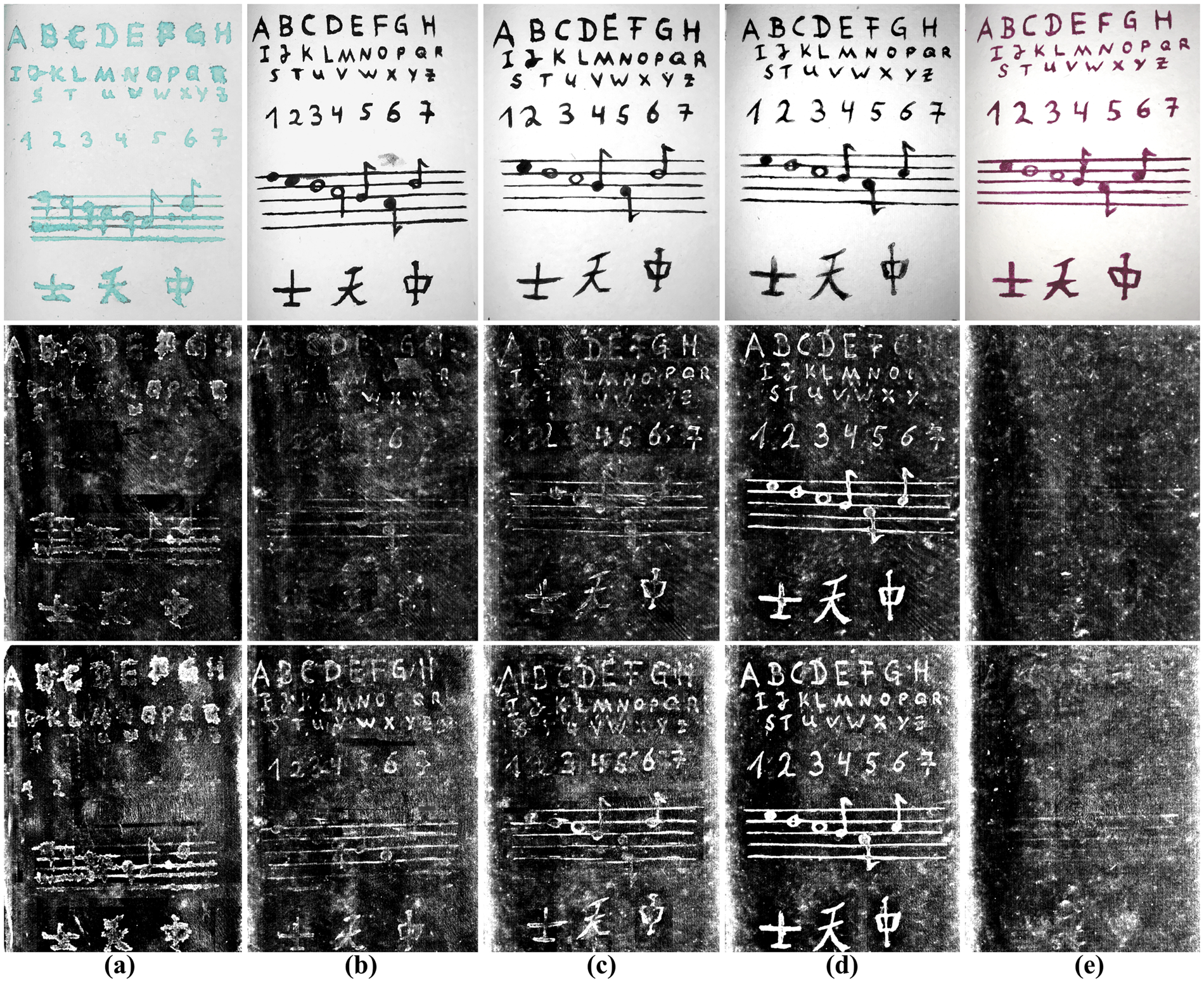
Comparison of different ink visibility under X-rays. (a) malachite ink, (b–d) iron gall ink 1–3. (e) Tyrian purple ink. The center row shows the reconstructed and 2-D mapped pages of the closed book for the 50 kV scan, the bottom row the 30 kV scan output.

Different inks look differently on X-ray scans. Analysis of six common inks (three types of iron gall, Tyrian purple, and buckthorn berries ink) showed that "all inks containing metallic particles are visible in the output, a decrease of the X-ray energy enhances the readability, and that the visibility highly depends on the X-ray attenuation of the ink's metallic ingredients and their concentration". Iron gall ink was commonly used for centuries; it consists of tannic acid, gum arabic, and iron salt. Tyrian purple ink was made from a "mucous secretion of sea snails containing Bromine".

== Usage ==
=== Jerash silver scroll ===
In 2015, researchers used virtual unfolding to read an 8th-century silver scroll from Jerash, Jordan. Unrolling revealed 17 lines of "presumed pseudo-Arabic as well as some magical signs". Such scrolls are known as lamellae and were used "for writing magical or apotropaic texts". Before the Jerash scroll, X-ray tomography was used for the Late Antique Mandaean lead scroll. The Jerash scroll was found in 2015 during the Danish-German Jerash Northwest Quarter Project excavation; the scroll "was folded, rolled and then placed in a cylindrical lead container".

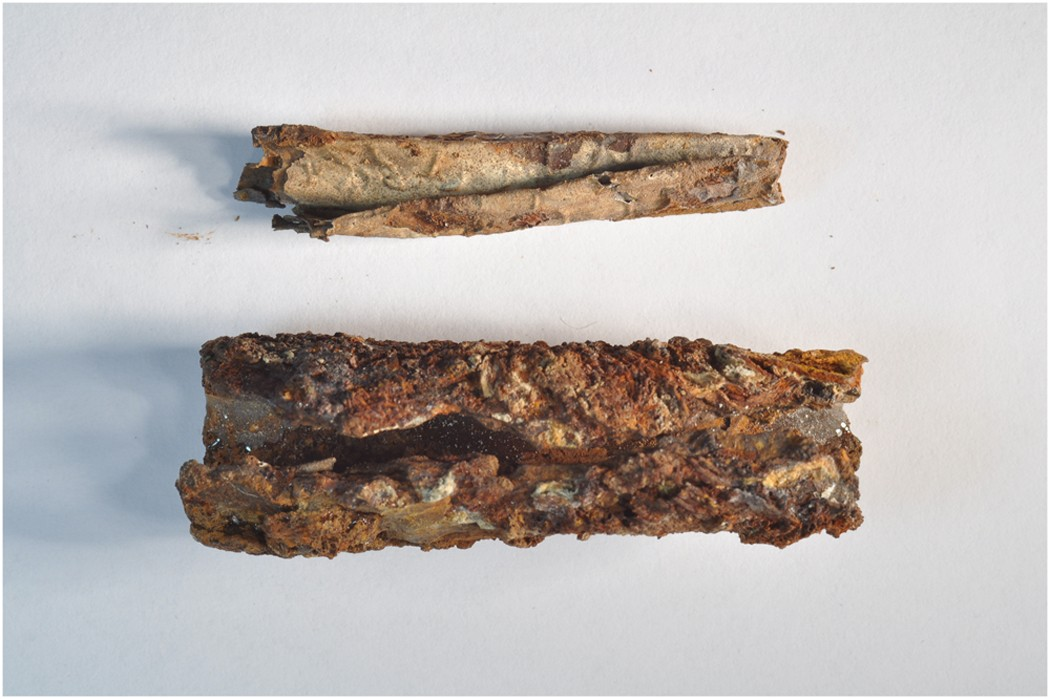
Silver scroll (above) and lead case (below) after separation by conservator.

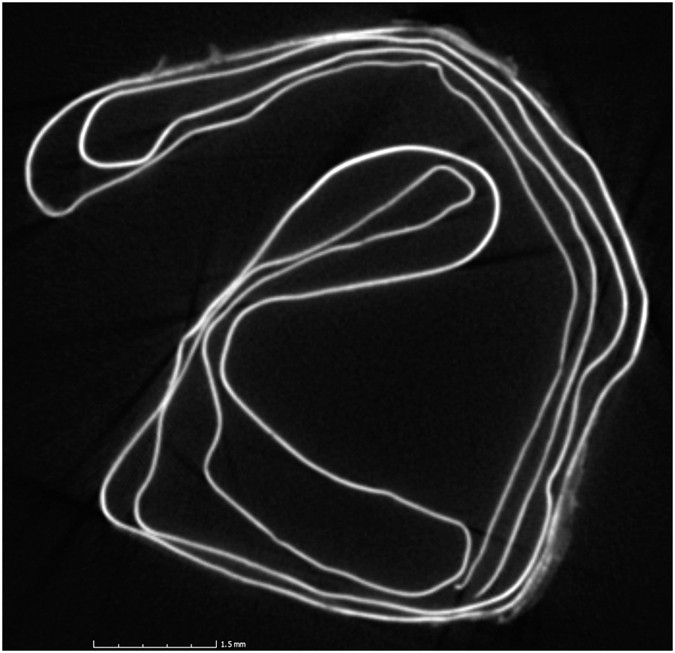
Slice showing the folding of the silver sheet.

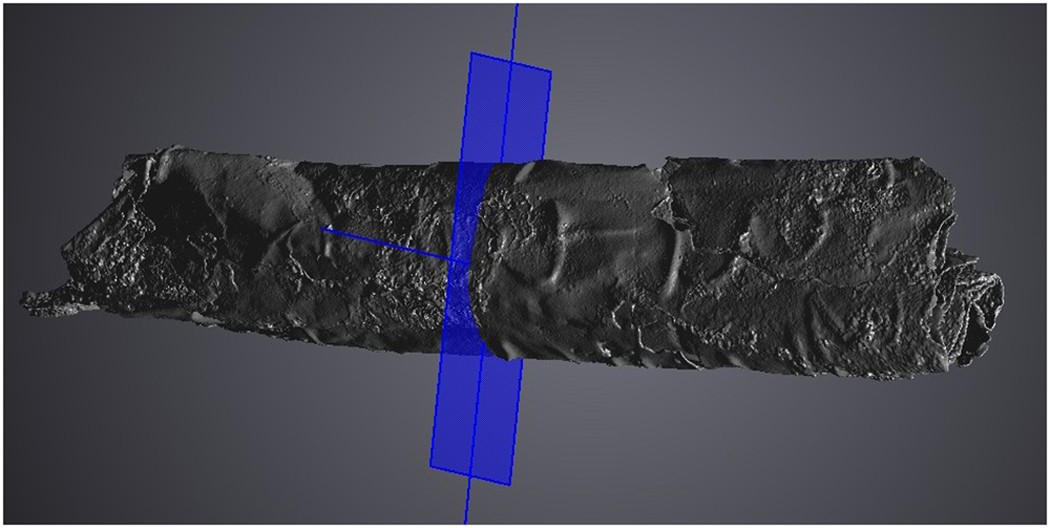
The scroll rendered in VGStudio MAX 3 Beta with indication of the slice shown

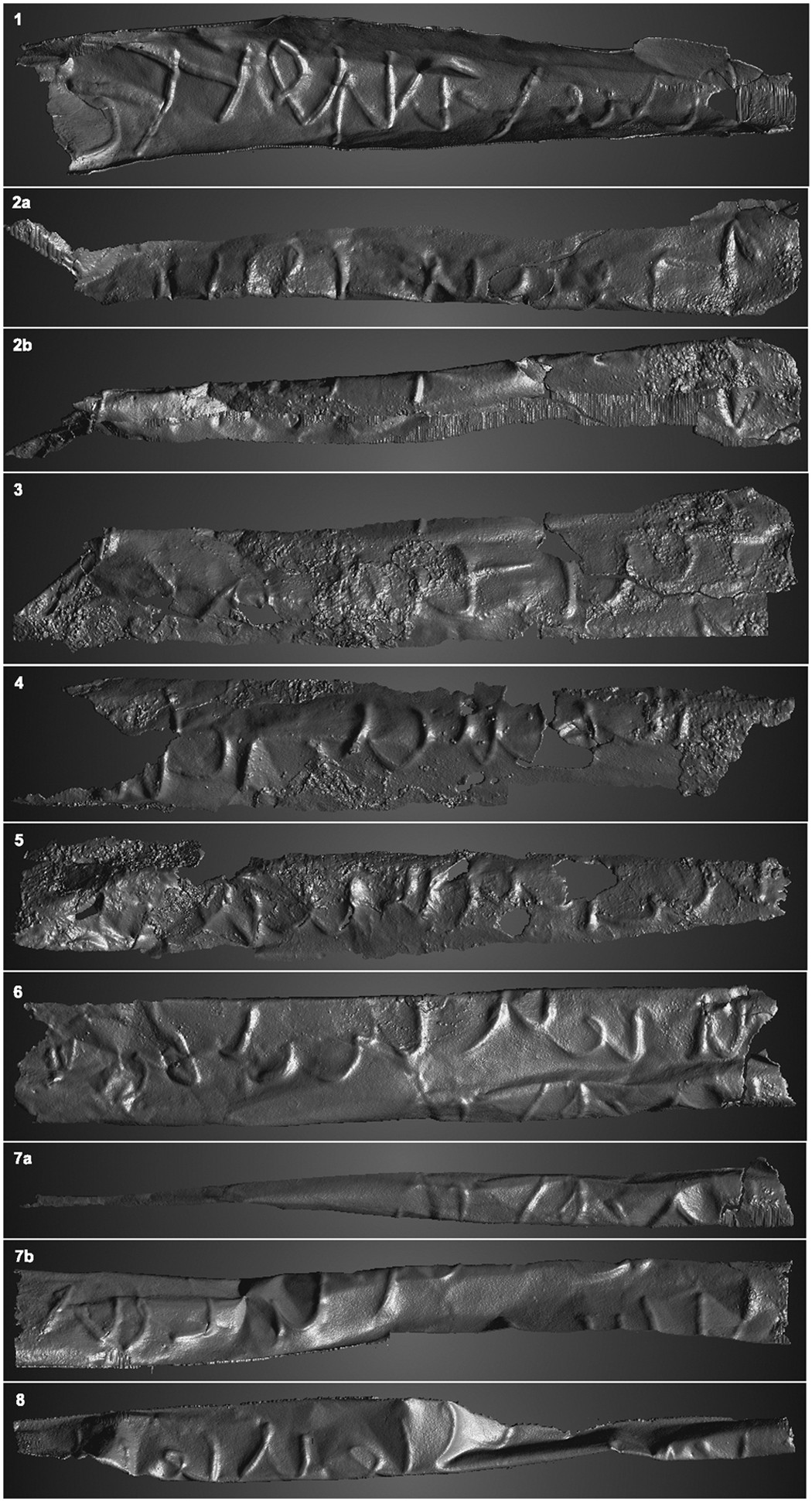
Lines 1–8 from the silver scroll; all back sides, mirrored.

=== En-Gedi Scroll ===
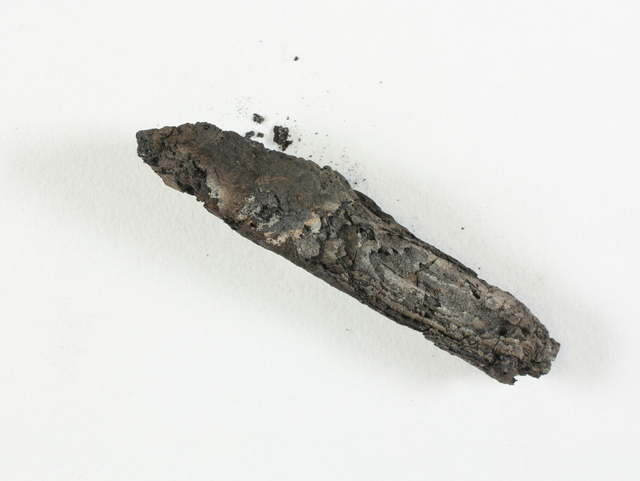
The charred ancient scroll from Ein Gedi

The En-Gedi Scroll is an ancient Hebrew parchment found in 1970 at Ein Gedi, Israel. Radiocarbon testing dates the scroll to the third or fourth century CE although there is disagreement over whether the evidence from the writing itself supports that date. The scroll was discovered to contain a portion of the biblical Book of Leviticus, making it the earliest copy of a Pentateuchal book ever found in a Torah ark.

Damaged by a fire in approximately 600 CE, the scroll is badly charred and fragmented and required noninvasive virtual unrolling, which was done in 2015 by a team led by Brent Seales of the University of Kentucky.

=== Diss Heywood Manor scroll ===
In 2018, Cardiff University's group applied virtual unrolling to a 16th-century burned scroll found in the Diss Heywood Manor in Norwich, England. The scroll has four sheets of parchment and was severely damaged by fire. It "contained information on life in the manor and included details on land transactions, disturbances of the peace, payment of fines, names of jurors and information on the upkeep of land". After the unrolling, researchers were able to read the scroll; text confirmed that it "relate to Heywood Hall and that it is a record of the Curia Generalis, the General Court, which usually refers to the Court Leet where peace keeping functions were exercised".

Before Diss Heywood Manor scroll, the group applied virtual unrolling to a 15th-century scroll from Bressingham Manor, Norfolk. The scroll was damaged by water, could be partially unrolled and became readable.

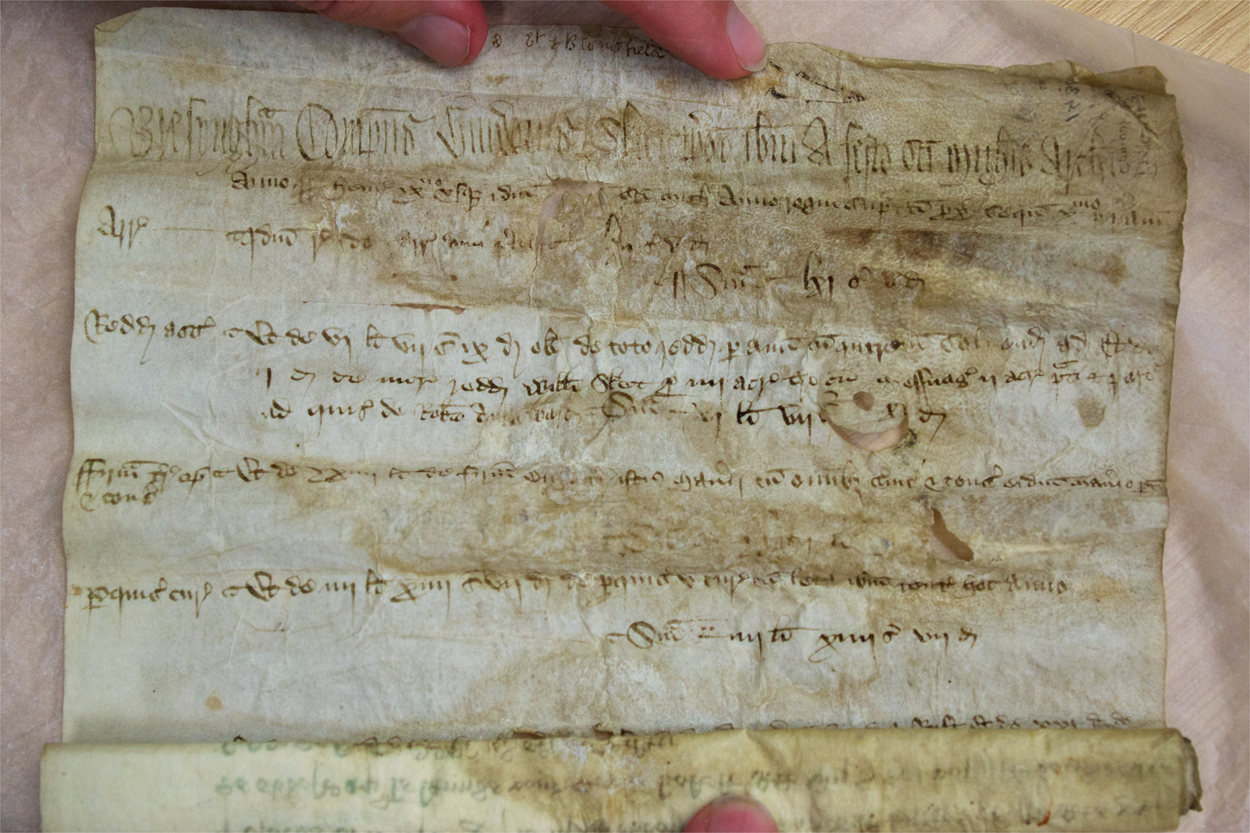
The 15th century Bressingham scroll, which can only be partially unrolled.

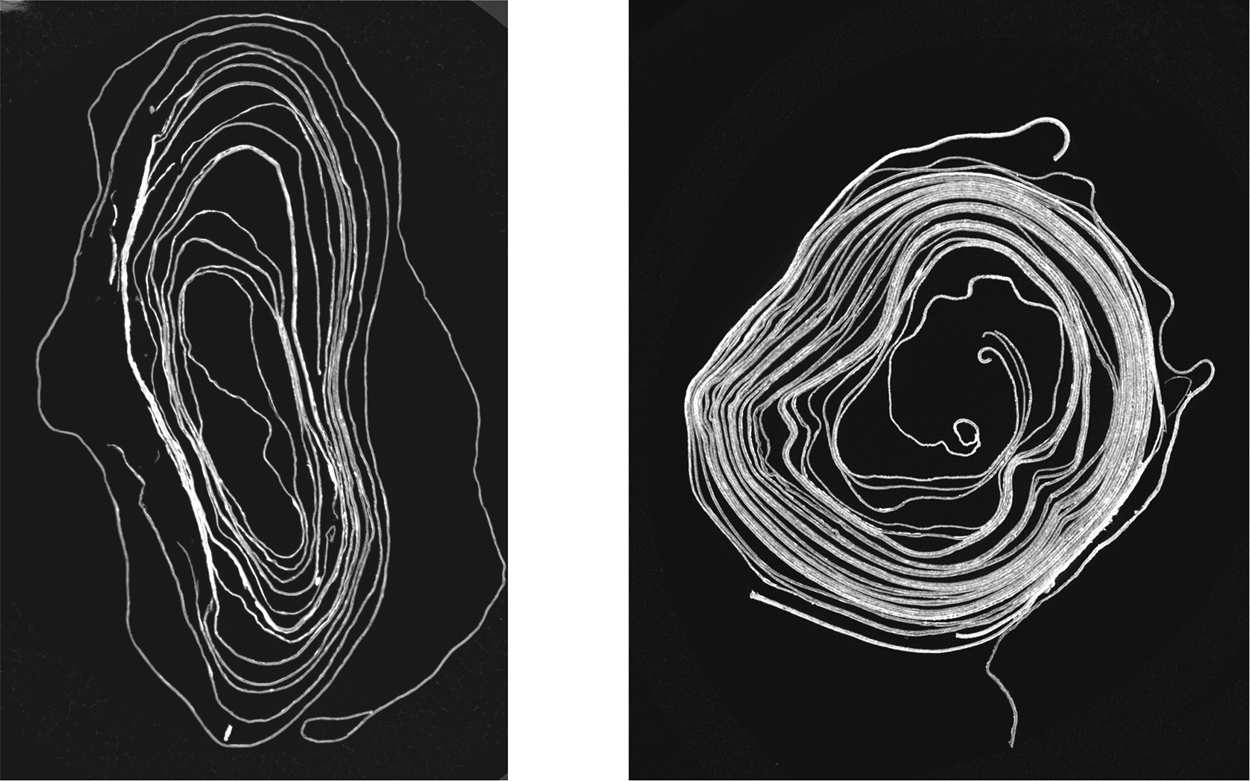
Slices from XMT scans of scrolls: (a) Bressingham, (b) Diss Heywood.

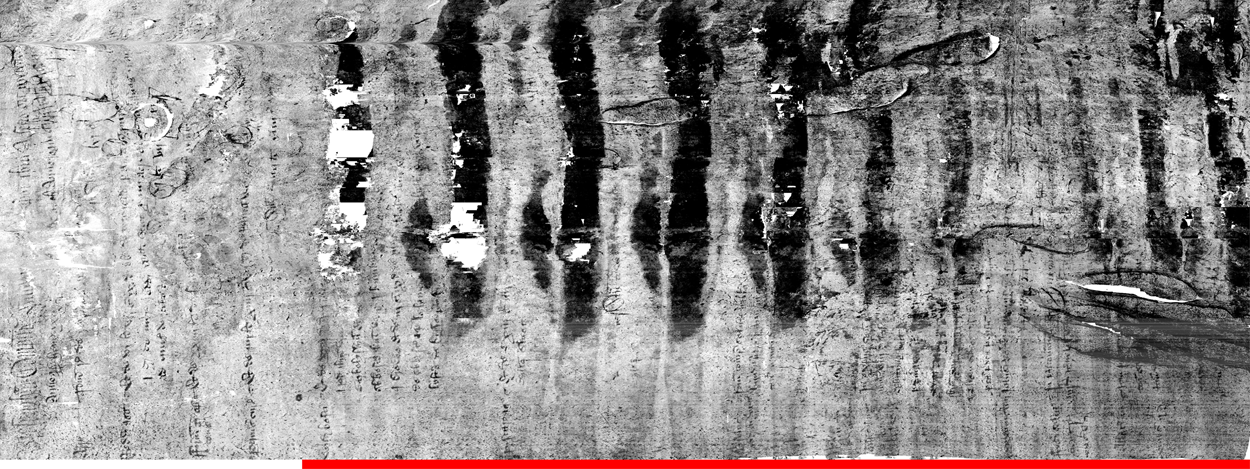
The results of applying virtual unrolling to the Bressingham scroll. The red line indicates the section of the scroll that cannot be physically unrolled without incurring damage.

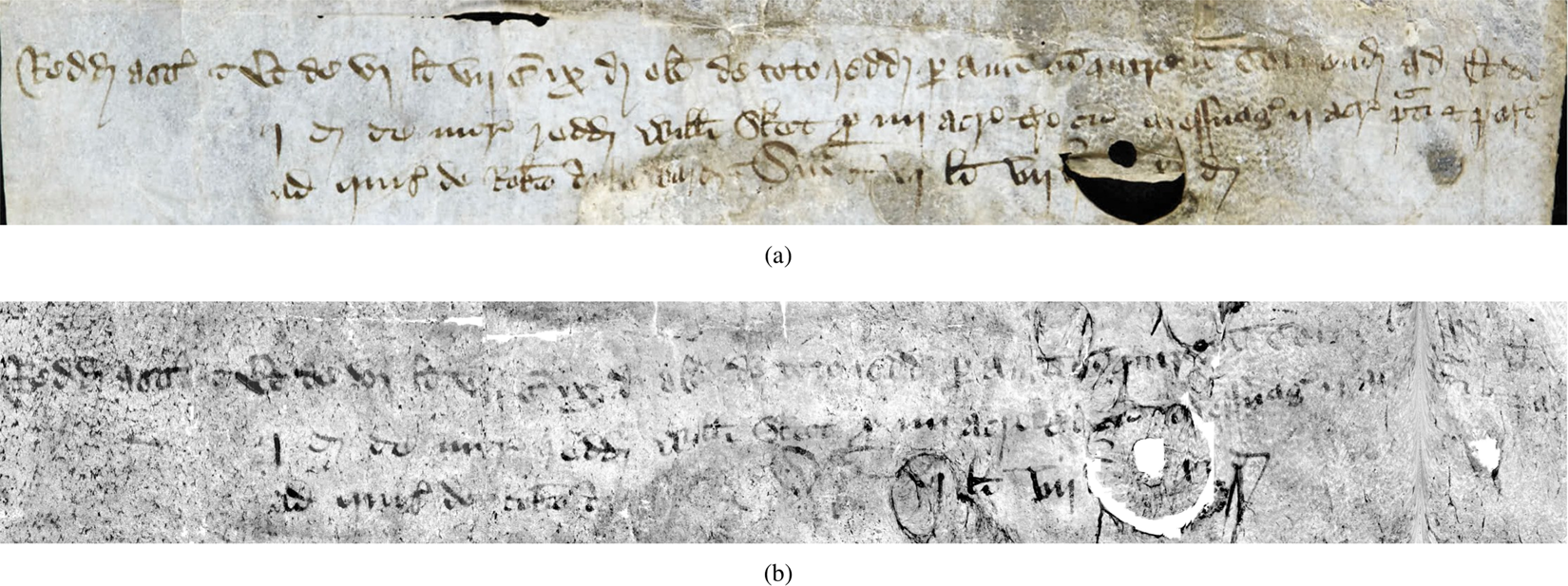
A section of the Bressingham scroll that is (a) visible after partial unrolling, and (b) the result recovered from the XMT scan.

=== Herculaneum papyri ===
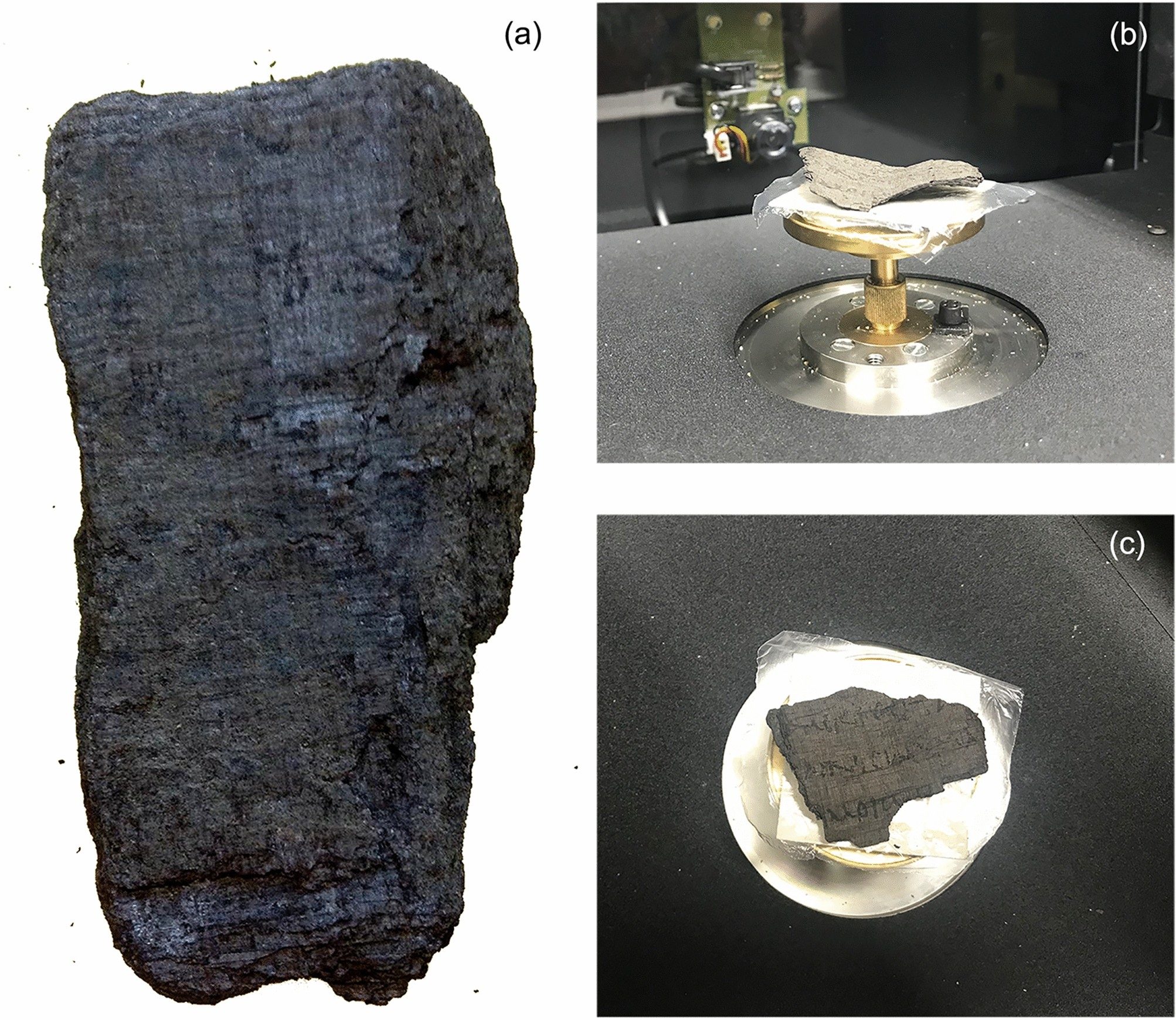
Photos of the papyrus fragments PHerc.1103 (a) and PHerc.110 (b,c). Image contrast and brightness were enhanced to better visualize the details visible to the naked eye on their external surface.

The Herculaneum papyri are more than 1,800 papyrus scrolls discovered in the 18th century in the Villa of the Papyri in Herculaneum. They had been carbonized when the villa was engulfed by the eruption of Mount Vesuvius in 79 AD. Multiple attempts were made to unroll the scroll mechanistically, and multiple scrolls were destroyed as a result.

In 2009, researchers from the Institut de France in conjunction with the French National Centre for Scientific Research imaged two intact Herculaneum papyri using X-ray micro-computed tomography to reveal the interior structure. The team heading the project estimated that if the scrolls were fully unwound they would be between 11 and 15 metres (36 and 49 ft) long. The internal structure of the rolls was revealed to be too compact and convoluted for the automated algorithms the team had developed. No ink was seen on the small samples imaged, because carbon-based inks are not visible on the carbonized scrolls; the chemical composition of such ink is extremely similar to that of the surrounding carbonized parchment. However, some scrolls were written with ink containing lead.

In 2015–2016, several research groups have proposed to unroll the scrolls virtually, using X-ray phase-contrast tomography, possibly with a synchrotron light source.

In 2018, Seales demonstrated a readable virtual unrolling of parts of a Herculaneum papyrus (P.Herc. 118) from the Bodleian Library, at Oxford University, which was given by King Ferdinand of Naples to the Prince of Wales in 1810. Seales used a handheld scanner called an Artec Space Spider instead of a tomograph. In the same year, he demonstrated a readable unrolling of another Herculaneum scroll, using the particle accelerator Diamond Light Source; through an X-ray imaging technique, ink containing trace amounts of lead was detected.

In 2023, Nat Friedman, Daniel Gross, and Seales announced the Vesuvius Challenge, a competition to decipher Herculaneum scrolls. They offered a $700,000 grand prize to be awarded to the first team that could extract four passages of text from two intact scrolls using 3D scans.

On 12 October 2023, the project awarded $40,000 to Luke Farritor, a 21-year-old computer student at the University of Nebraska, for successfully detecting the first word in an unopened scroll: porphyras (Ancient Greek: ΠΟΡΦΥΡΑϹ, lit. 'purple'). With this milestone "first word" award included, the project has awarded $260,000 in total for segmentation tooling and ink detection (from segmented volumes).

On 5 February 2024, the project awarded its 2023 Grand Prize of $700,000 to the winning team and $50,000 each to three runner-up teams for successfully revealing 5% of one scroll, and announced its goal for 2024 of revealing 90% of the four scrolls that it has fully scanned. The uncovered text is believed to be a previously unknown text of Philodemus, "centered on the pleasures of music and food and their effects on the senses".

As of 2025, the scans of the scrolls that are being provided to participants in the Vesuvius Challenge for the purpose of fully reading them are Scroll 1 (PHerc. Paris. 4), from the Institut de France, which is 5% read, Scroll 2 (PHerc. Paris 3), from the Institut de France, Scroll 3 (PHerc. 332), from the Biblioteca Nazionale di Napoli, a smaller scroll known as the midollo (marrow), left over from attempts to physically unroll the larger original scroll, Scroll 4 (PHerc. 1667), from the Biblioteca Nazionale di Napoli, similar in size to Scroll 3, and Scroll 5 (PHerc. 172), from the Bodleian Library in Oxford, similar in size to Scroll 1.

In June 2026, the Vesuvius Challenge team announced that PHerc. 1667, known within the project as "Scroll 4", had been virtually unwrapped and read end-to-end. A project preprint described the work as the first complete virtual unwrapping and extended reading of a rolled Herculaneum papyrus. In the PHerc. 1667, 22 columns of text were recovered, containing "a Stoic philosophical treatise that may be attributable to Chrysippus". Besides PHerc. 1667, the team were able to read the tile and author of PHerc. 139: Philodemus, On Gods, Book 8.

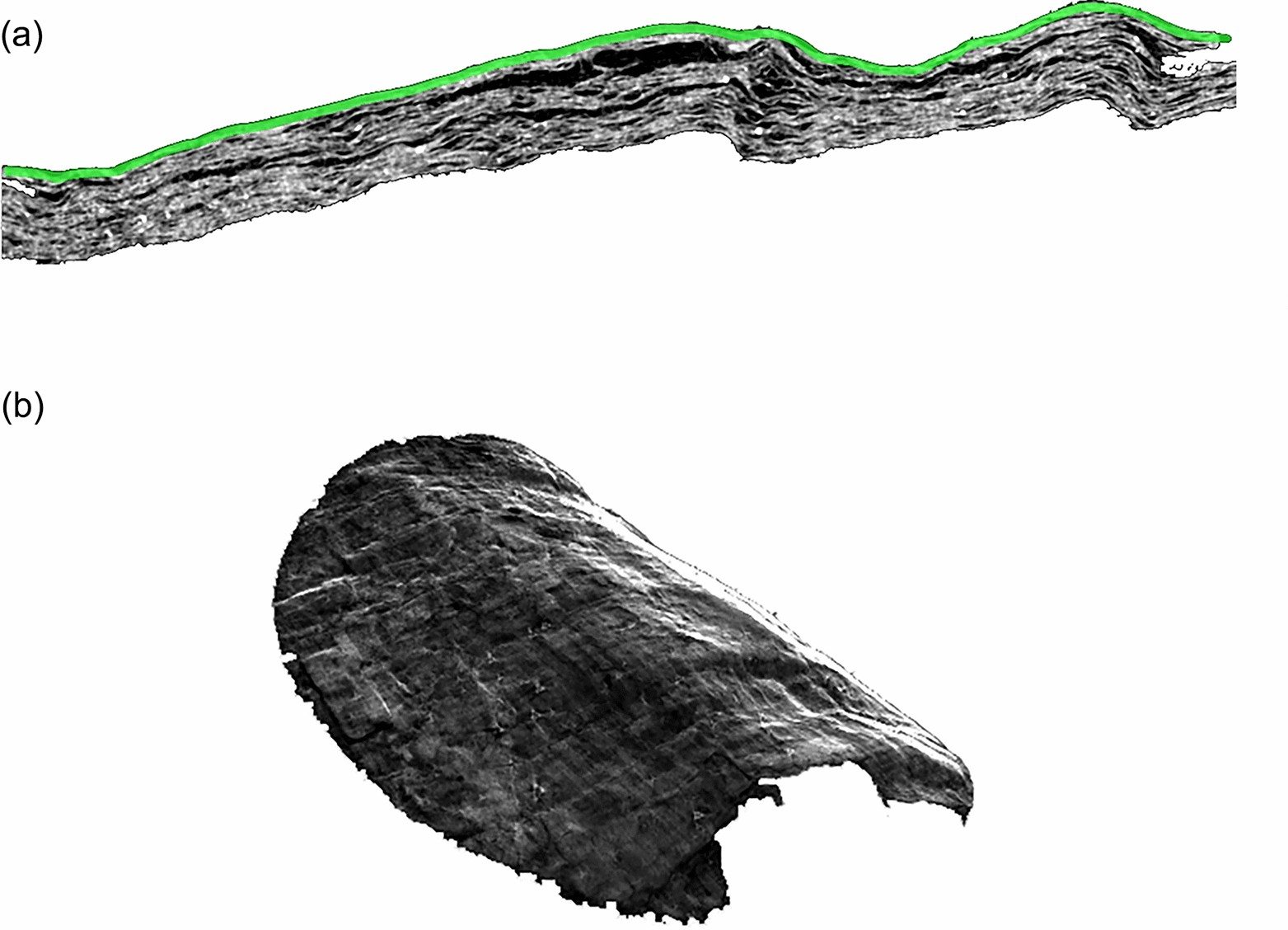
PHerc.110 image acquired using micro-CT

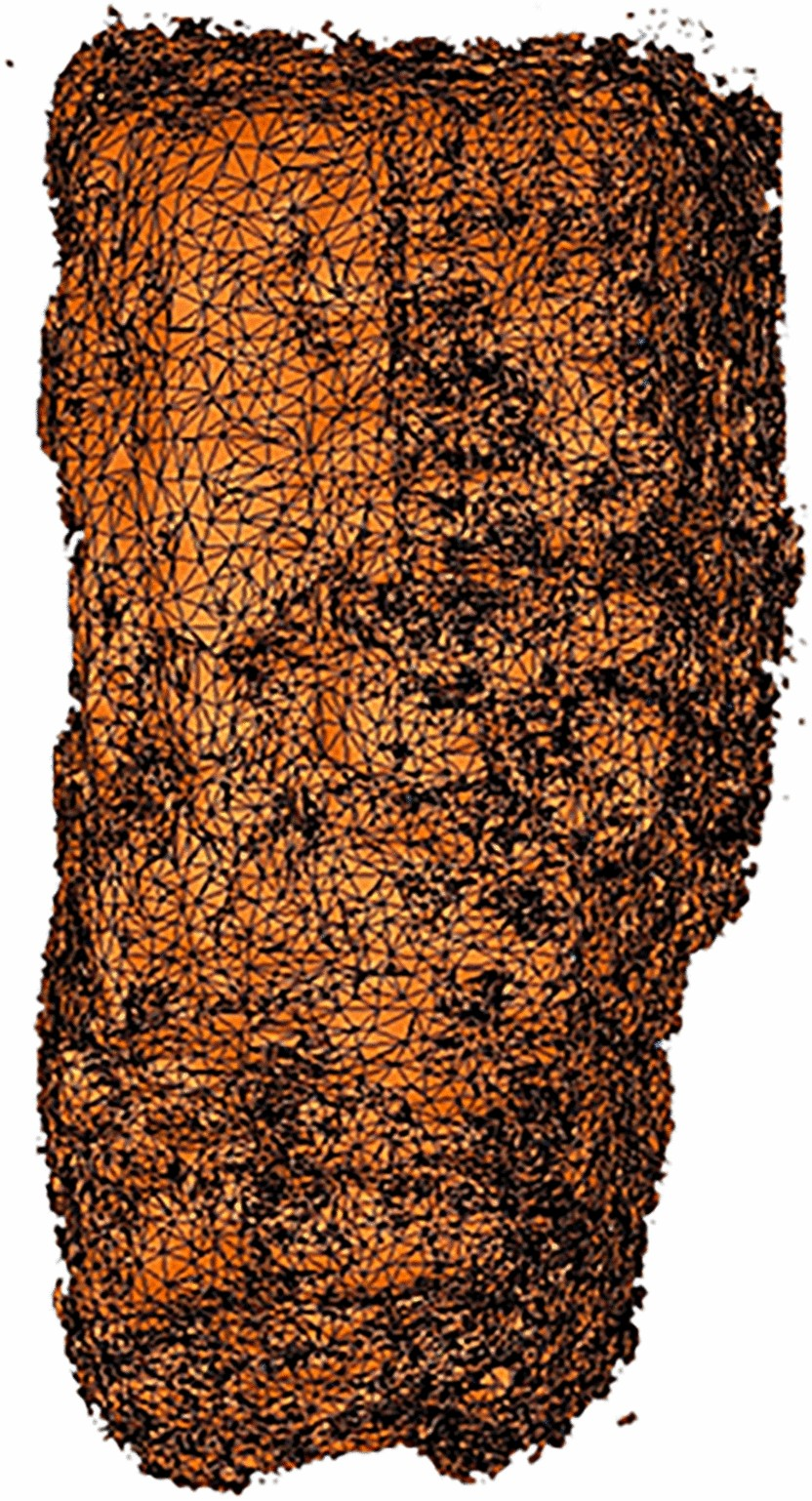
The triangular meshing of PHerc.1103 (a simplified representation of the mesh)

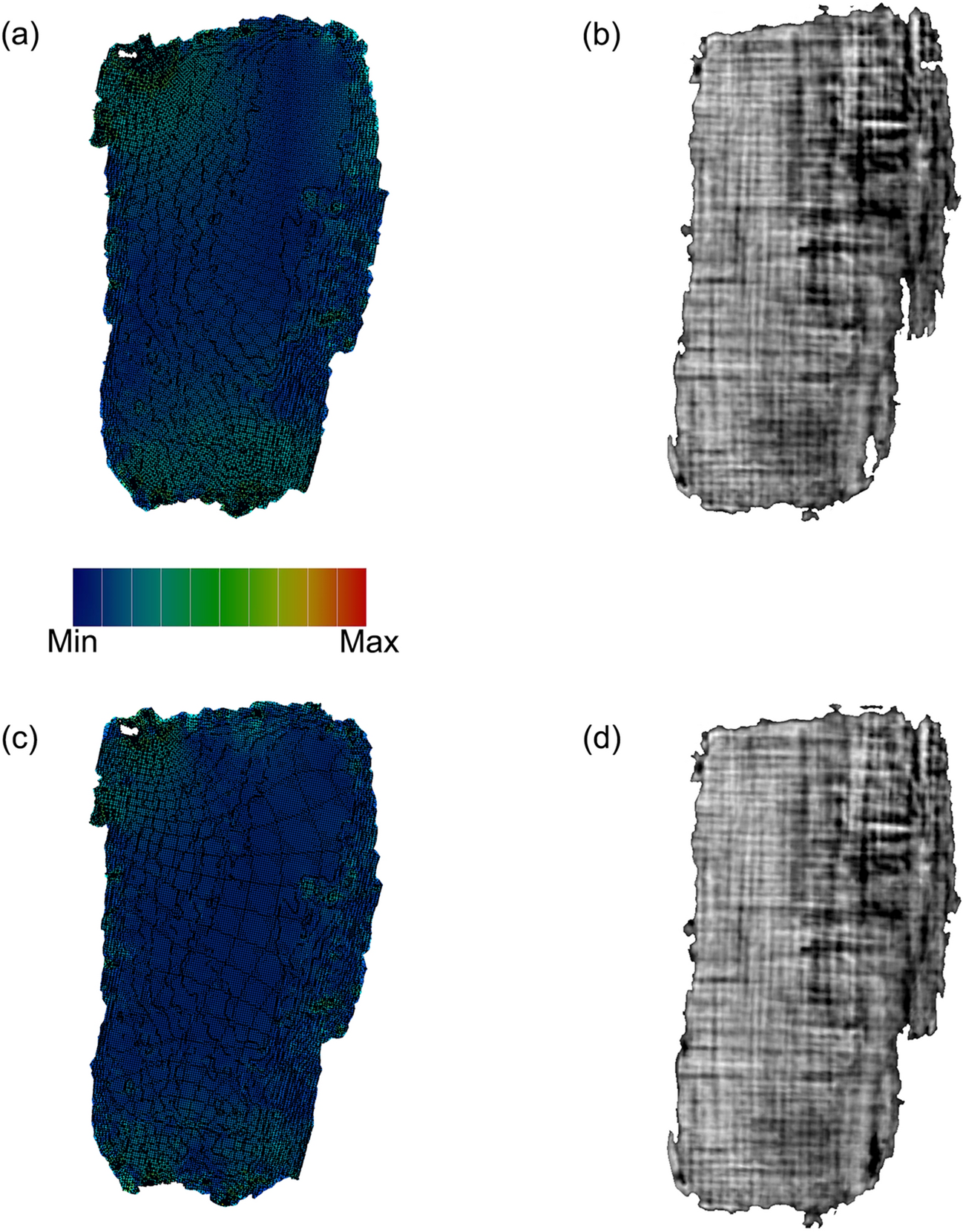
Comparison between different parameterization methods for the digital flattening of a sheet extracted from PHerc. 1103

=== Chinese soiled bamboo scrolls ===
In 2019, researchers used virtual unfolding on Chinese bamboo scrolls contaminated by soil. Bamboo scrolls with carbon-based inks were used from Shang to the Jin dynasty. Researchers used modern bamboo scrolls to develop the technique. The scrolls are made from individual bamboo slips rolled together, with writing inside.

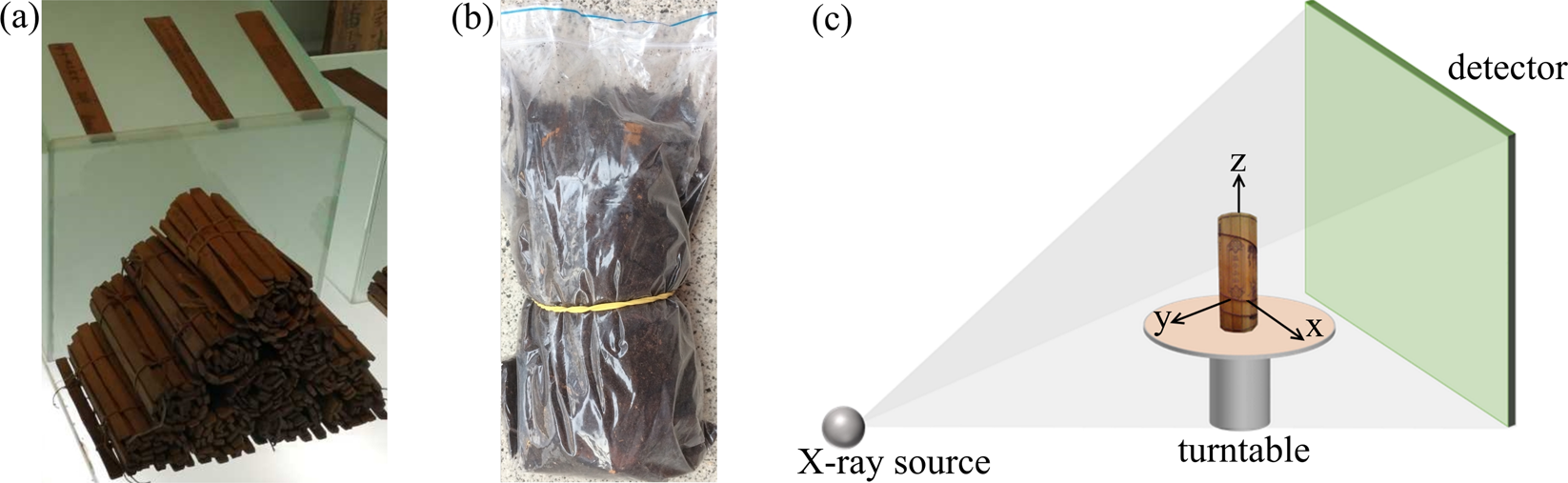
The 3-D X-ray CT scanning of bamboo scrolls

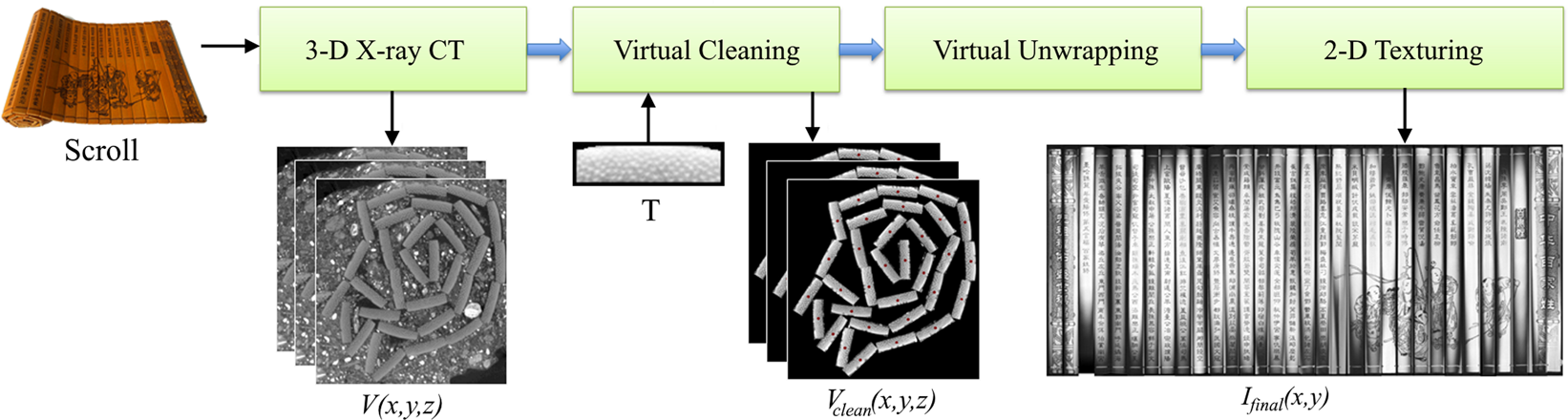
The proposed digitization pipeline

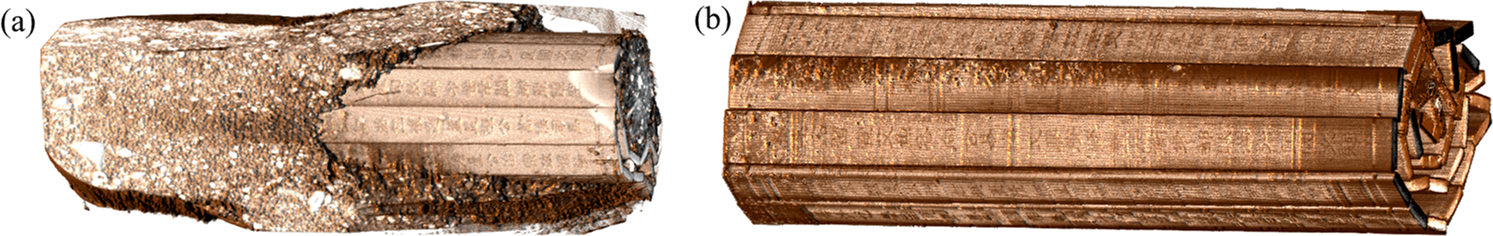
Reconstructed and rendered soiled Scroll A before and after virtual cleaning

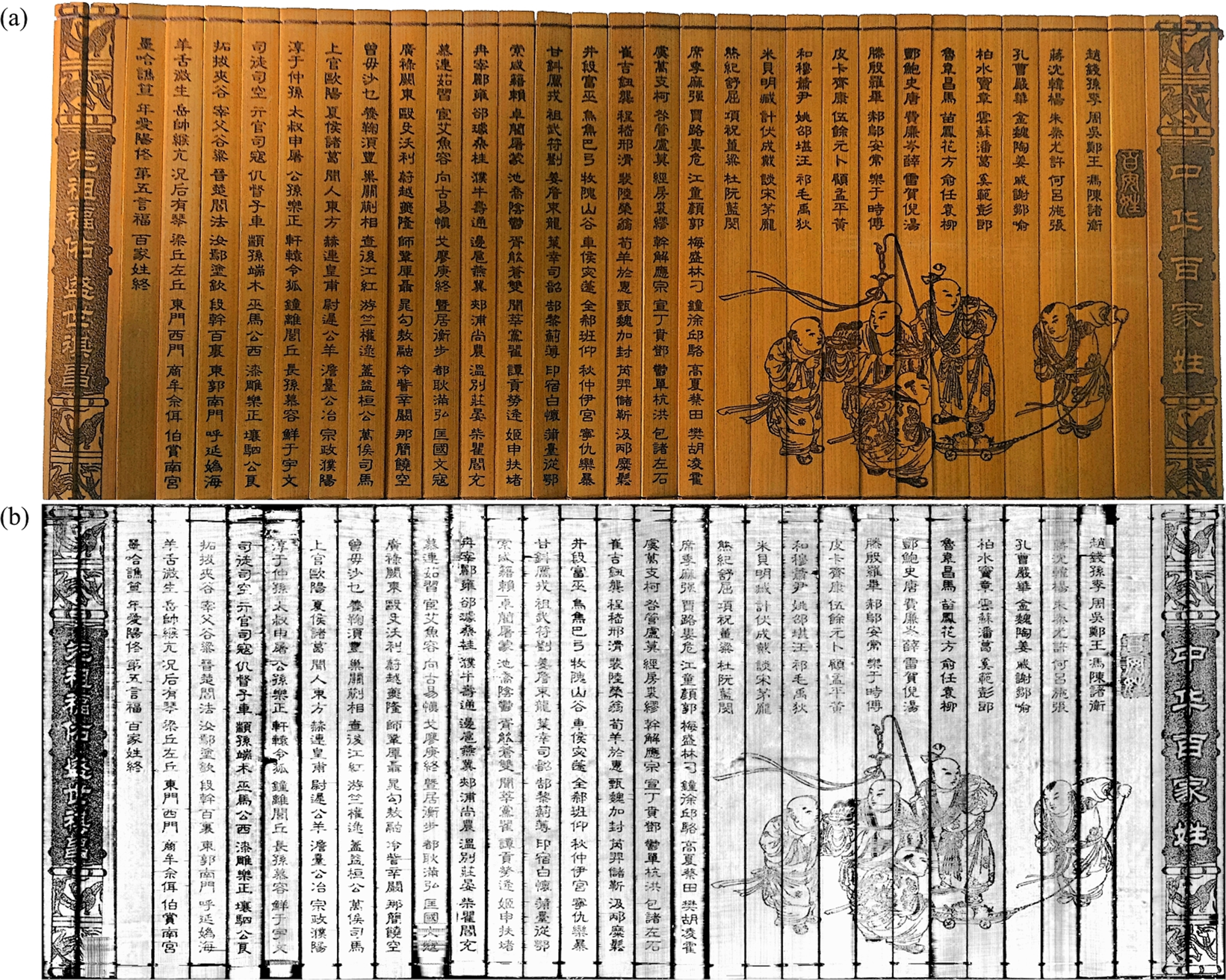
A photograph of manually unwrapped and reconstructed scroll

=== Egyptian papyri ===
In 2017, virtual unfolding was used for Ancient Egyptian papyri and modern mockups with text written in "very highly absorbent red ink, made from cinnabar and minium". In 2019, the technique was used to study several damaged Egyptian papyri fragments. On one of the fragments, a Coptic word "Lord" was seen.

=== Renaissance Europe letterpackets ===
In 2021, researchers used virtual unfolding to read content of unopened letterpackets from Renaissance Europe. Authors also analyzed and classified letterlocks that often can't be read without a non-damaging method. One unopened letter from 1697 was read: it was "a request from Jacques Sennacques, dated July 31, 1697, to his cousin Pierre Le Pers, a French merchant in The Hague, for a certified copy of a death notice of one Daniel Le Pers".

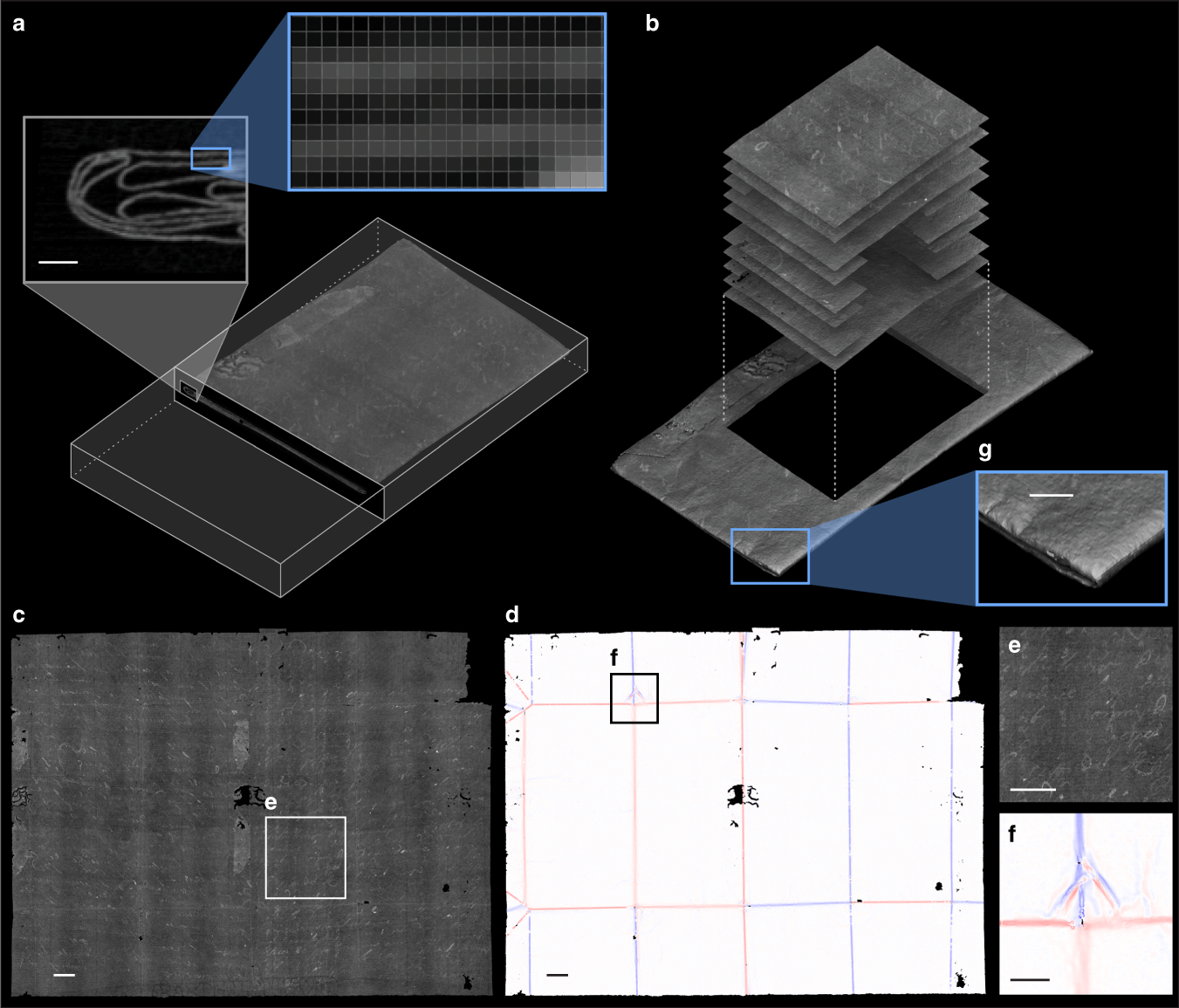
High-level overview of virtual unfolding showing

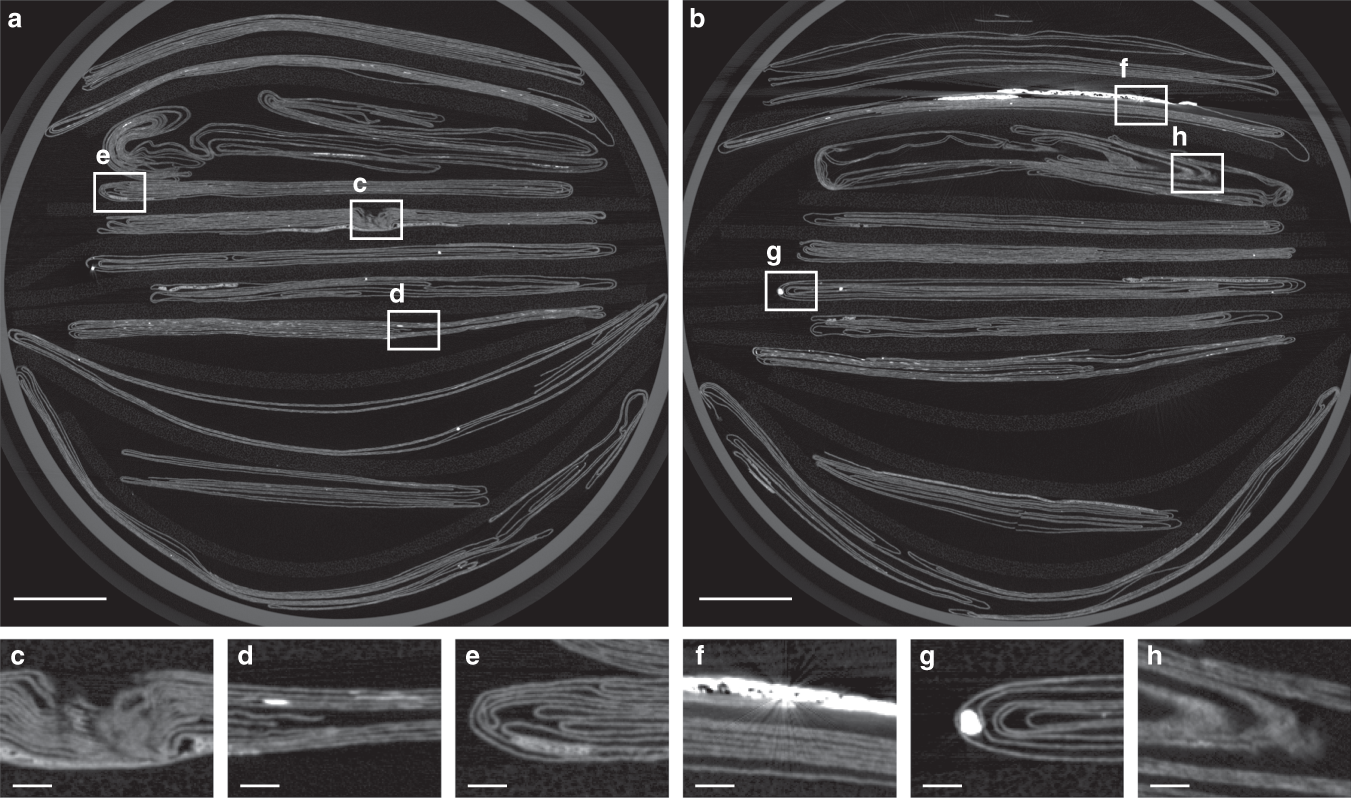
Two sample cross sections of XMT data

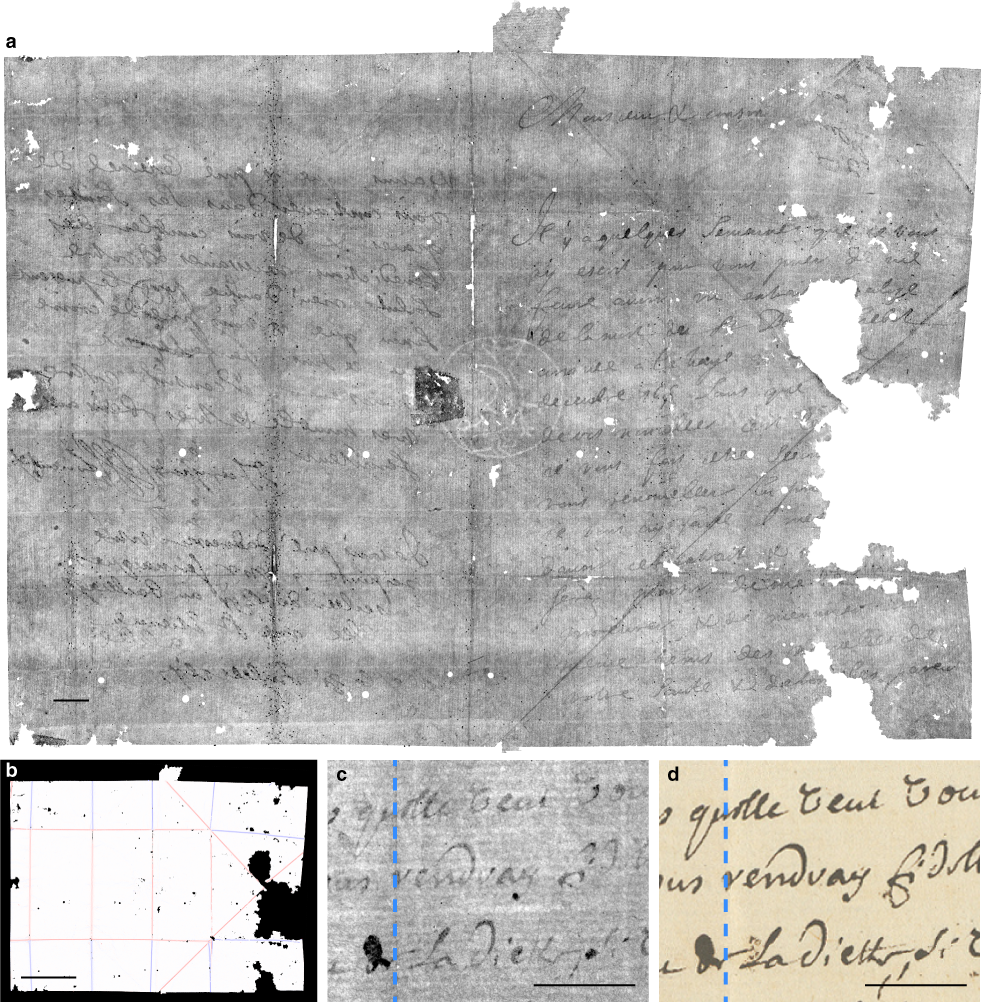
Virtual unfolding results for unopened letter DB-1627 (a, b) and opened letter DB-2040, showing a XMT-textured image after virtual unfolding

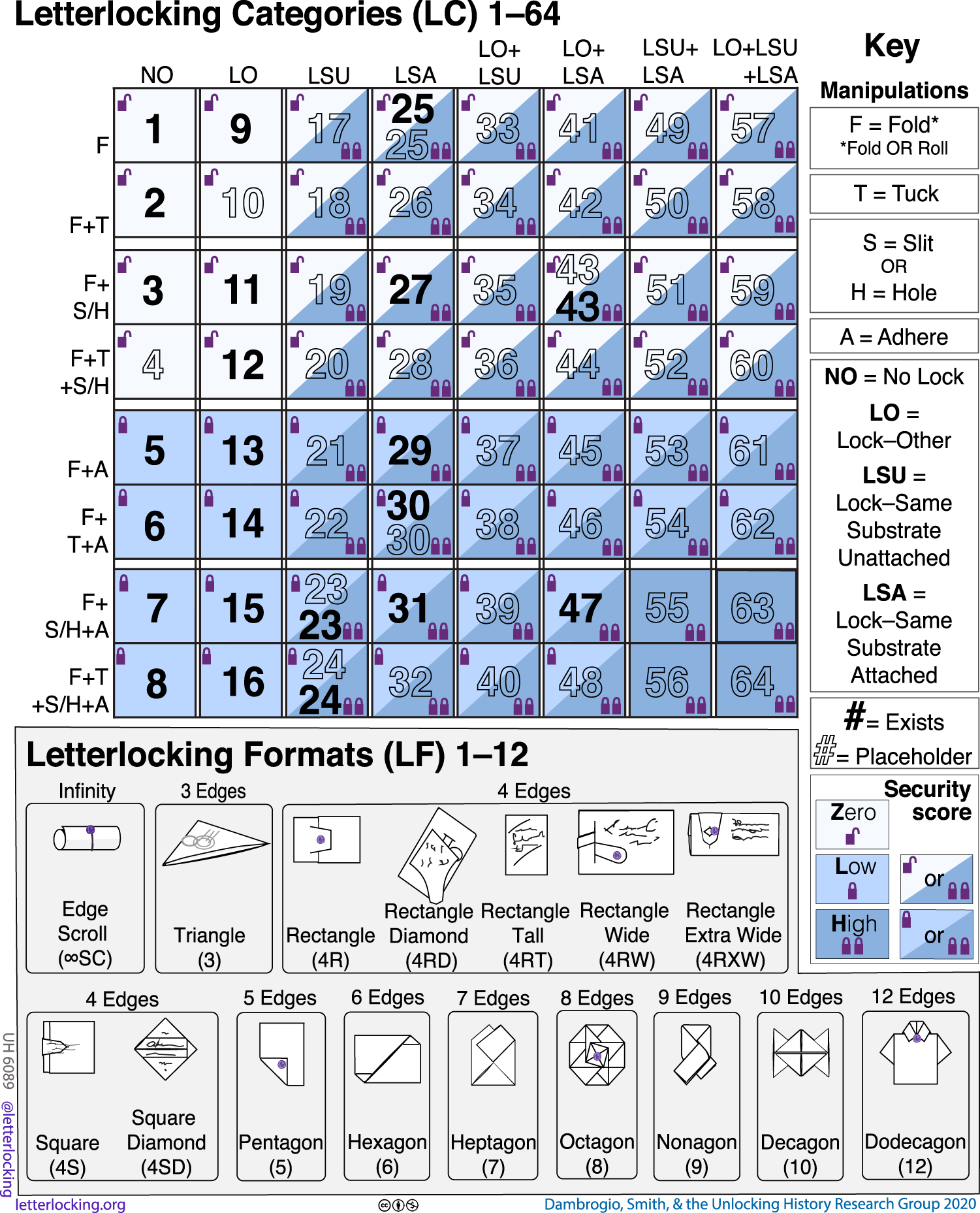
Letterlocking categories 1–64, based on manipulations and assigned security score.

=== Frankfurt silver inscription ===
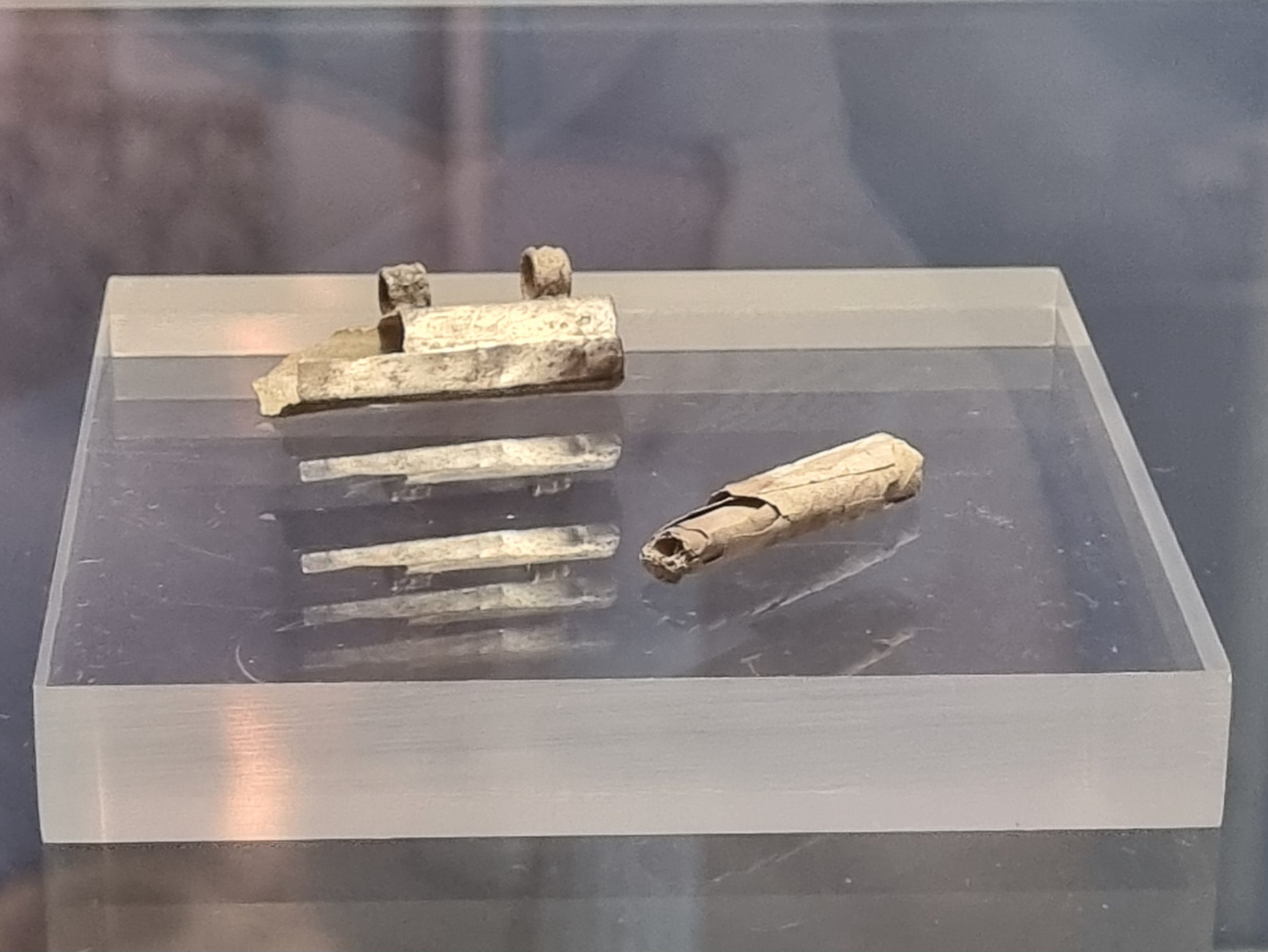
The amulet with the Frankfurt silver inscription

The Frankfurt silver inscription is an 18-line Latin engraving on a piece of silver foil, housed in a protective amulet dating to the mid-3rd century AD. Due to its reference to Jesus Christ, it represents the oldest known evidence of Christianity north of the Alps, and from its explicit invocation of Saint Titus, it is the earliest evidence of the Christian practice and belief of the veneration and intercession of saints. The amulet was discovered in 2018 during archaeological excavations at a cemetery near the former Roman town of Nida, located in the northwestern suburbs of Frankfurt am Main.

During restoration at the Frankfurt Archaeological Museum, the amulet and silver foil were separated. In 2019, X-ray imaging revealed the presence of an inscription on the inside of the silver foil. The thin, fragile foil could not be unrolled physically, so it was scanned via computed tomography by the Leibniz Center for Archaeology and Goethe University Frankfurt. A 3D model of the foil was created, enabling virtual unrolling.

=== Battery degradation research ===
Virtual unrolling technique, developed for damaged scrolls, was adapted and used to virtually unroll lithium batteries, which gave the researchers a "unique insight into the dynamics of Li transport during charge and discharge".

=== Mongolian Buddhist scroll ===
In 2025, researchers used virtual unrolling to read a Mongolian Buddhist scroll from the Mongolian collection of the Ethnological Museum of Berlin, found inside a shrine, or gungervaa in Mongolian.

The shrine was obtained during the 1927–1935 Sino-Swedish Expedition led by Sven Hedin. The German meteorologist Waldemar Haude "came into possession" of the shrine and gave it to his friend, a Sinologist and Mongolist Ferdinand Lessing, the curator of the East Asian collections at the Ethnological Museum in Berlin. Three scrolls wrapped in yellow silk were inside the shrine. The scrolls contain dharanis, Buddhist mantras or prayers. The researchers note that "physical unwrapping and unrolling was not an option for ethical reasons according to international museum standards in conservation". They used synchrotron tomography to create a 3D model, scanning the scrolls at BESSY 2 in Berlin. (Note: The paper described technical details of the scanning process: "The monochromatic beam energy was set to 35 keV to achieve sufficient contrast and low dose on the object. Like most other imaging beamlines at synchrotron storage rings, BAMline is limited in its field-of-view, so the scrolls had to be scanned at different height positions. After reconstruction, all sub-volumes were combined to one volume showing almost the entire scroll at a high volumetric resolution (isotropic voxel size of 3.6 µm). For each sub-volume a stack of 2570 projections was taken over 180°.")

Virtual unrolling make it possible to see that the scrolls were written in Tibetan characters in Sanskrit. Only one inscription was read, the mantra "Om mani padme hum". The characters became visible under X-rays because the ink contained some metal phases; authors note that this is unusual because "Chinese ink traditionally consists of a mixture of soot as a black pigment and animal glue as a binding agent".

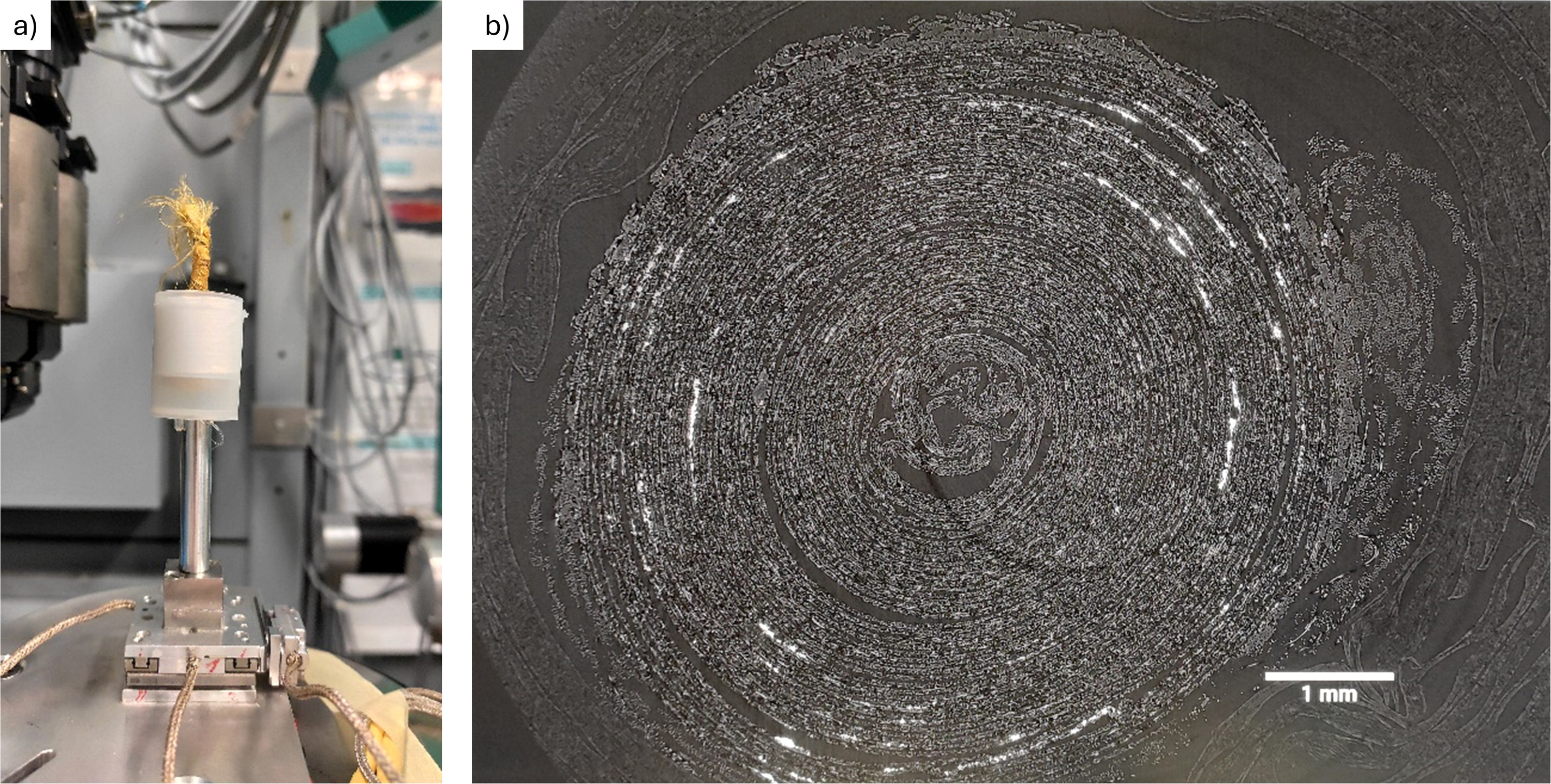
a) Scroll inside synchrotron X-ray beam at BAMline, BESSY 2. b) reconstructed cross-section of a scroll. Areas that contain metal appear bright, while the paper of the scroll is shown as light gray in color, and air in dark gray.

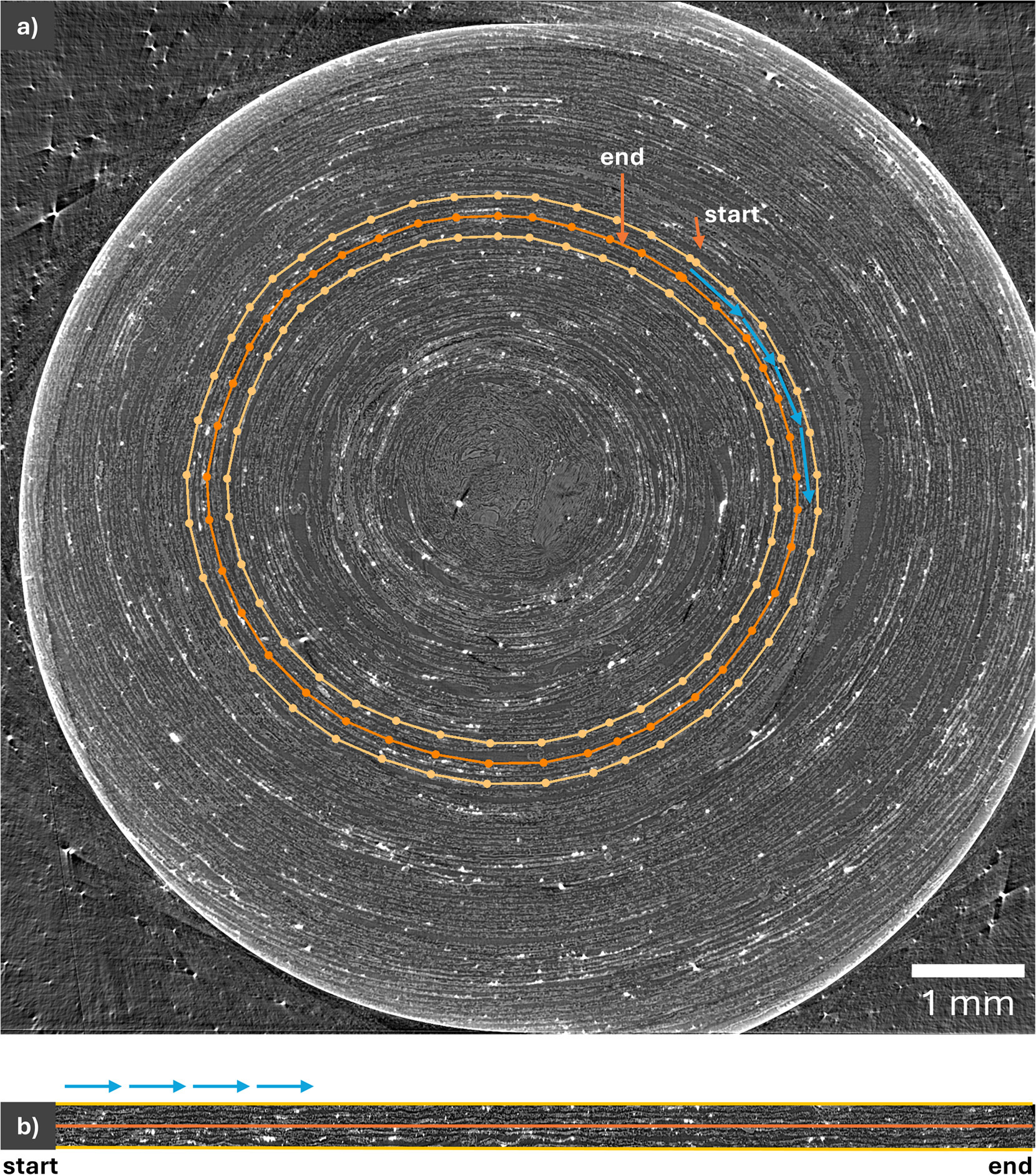
a) Cross-section of a reconstructed slice. The course for the virtual unrolling needed to be created manually in several slices of the 3D volume. b) Cross-section of unrolled and flattened volume.

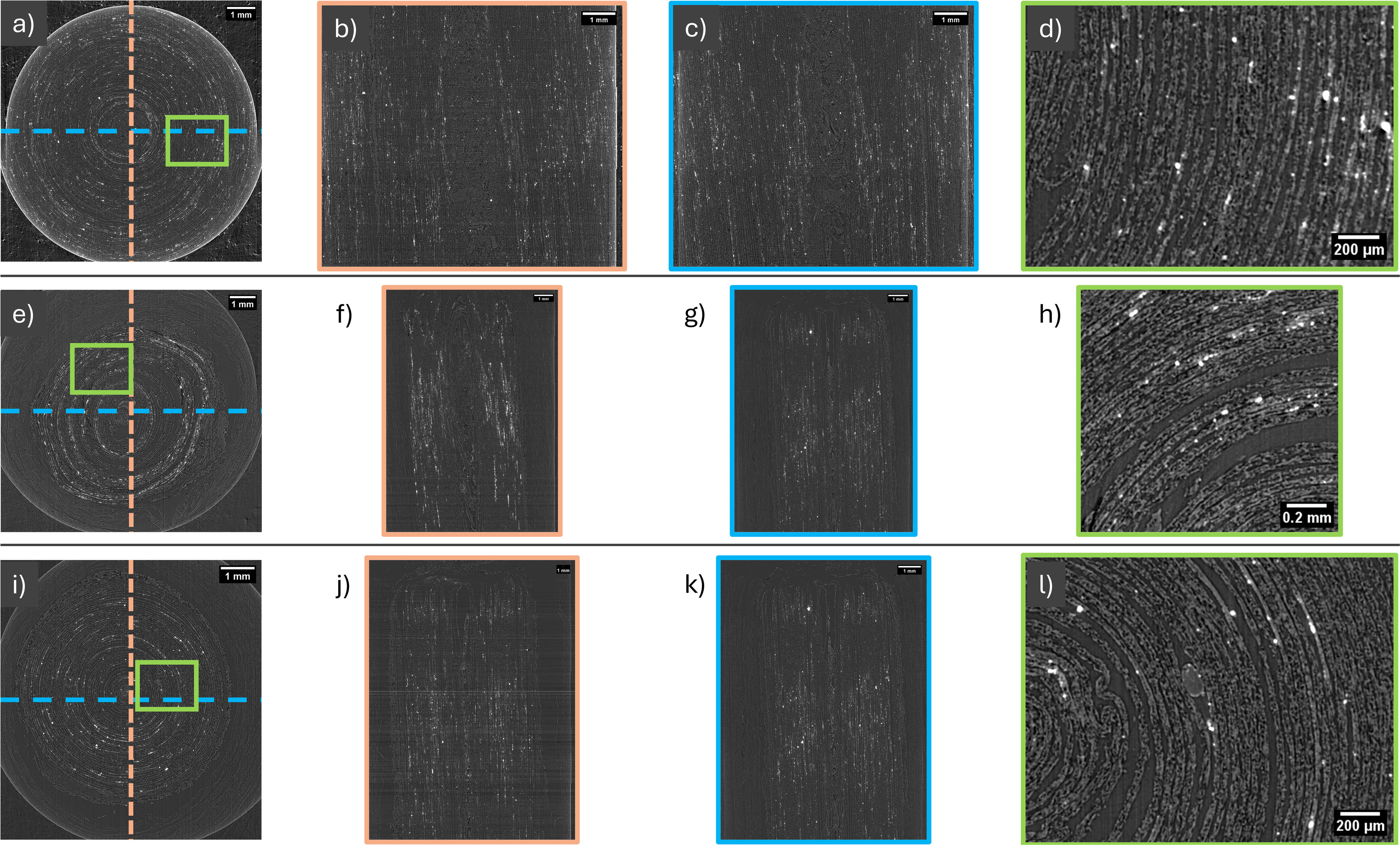
Cross-sections and magnification of scroll "I" (a-d), scroll "II" (e-h) and scroll "III" (i-l).

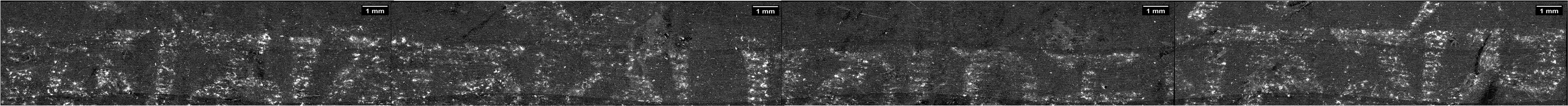
Text is visible in unrolled volume "Om mani padme hum".
