= Giovanni Carlo Scaramelli =

Venetian diplomat

Giovanni Carlo Scaramelli (1550-1608) was a Venetian diplomat based in London at the end of the reign of Elizabeth I and the beginning of the reign of James VI and I.

Scaramelli was a secretary rather than an ambassador. His insightful letters describing the court in London and politics are held by the State Archives of Venice. He was lodged in a new house near the Tower of London which had an Italian-style garden, made by the owner, a merchant from Lucca.

Scaramelli had his first and only audience with Queen Elizabeth on 10 February 1603 at Richmond Palace. She was dressed in silver and white and white taffeta embroidered with gold. She wore necklaces of pearls and rubies and pearl bracelets, and other gems pinned and embroidered to her costume. Her skirts were more voluminous than the French fashion, presumably supported with a farthingale. Her hair or wig was a light colour "never made by nature", dressed with great pearls at her forehead. She wore an imperial crown, a crown with arches. Scaramelli gained a favourable impression of Arbella Stuart and her learning, although she was far from court at Hardwick Hall, which he thought was 50 miles from London.

He wrote of the body of Queen Elizabeth at Westminster Palace in April 1603, still attended by her Privy Council although she was wrapped in cere-cloth and in her coffin encased in lead. Scaramelli claimed that portraits of Elizabeth were put aside in favour of Mary, Queen of Scots, now said to have been executed for her religion. King James crossed the border, intending to call himself King of Great Britain, like the ancient King Arthur. Scaramelli thought Elizabeth's wooden funeral effigy seemed almost alive.

In June 1603 he brought a letter from the Doge of Venice to King James. With a smile, James recalled previously receiving letters from the Doge which he could not open without breaking the seal. Scaramelli opened the letter for him. The practice of intricately folding and sealing letters is now known as letterlocking.

Six great ladies of the court escorted by 200 horsemen set out to welcome Anne of Denmark at Berwick-upon-Tweed. Scaramelli heard that she had tailors alter Elizabeth's costly and gorgeous robes to fit her. He believed that Anne of Denmark was a Catholic and refused to take the Protestant sacrament on the morning of her coronation, despite the insistence of the Archbishops. In this report he constructed and shaped a narrative of heroic resistance that would please his Catholic sponsors.

According to Scaramelli, King James gave Anne of Denmark valuable jewels and Nonsuch Palace. In August 1603 Scaramelli visited Princess Elizabeth and Prince Henry at Oatlands. Henry, using an interpreter, told him about his interests in dancing, tennis, and hunting. They both intended to learn Italian.

Scaramelli described appointments made by King James in his letter to the Doge Marino Grimani of 22 May 1603. A number of high offices were given to Scottish courtiers. English courtiers found it more difficult to access the king's Privy Chamber.

The court moved west during a plague epidemic in the autumn. Scaramelli went to Oxford while the King was at Woodstock Palace, then Winchester. Visitors to the court needed a passport or ticket certifying they were not from an infected area. Scaramelli discussed with James the issue of English pirates operating near Zakynthos. He met the new Venetian ambassador Nicolò Molin at Southampton on 9 November 1603. Scaramelli escorted Prince Henry from Wilton House to the ambassador's lodging in Salisbury for dinner on 8 December.

Scaramelli left England for Holland on 26 December 1603, and was in Brussels on 7 January 1603. He observed the fortifications and siege-works at Ostend on his way.

His sons Francesco Scaramelli and Moderante Scaramelli were diplomats in Istanbul.
