= Letterlocking =

Methods for securing a letter without an envelope

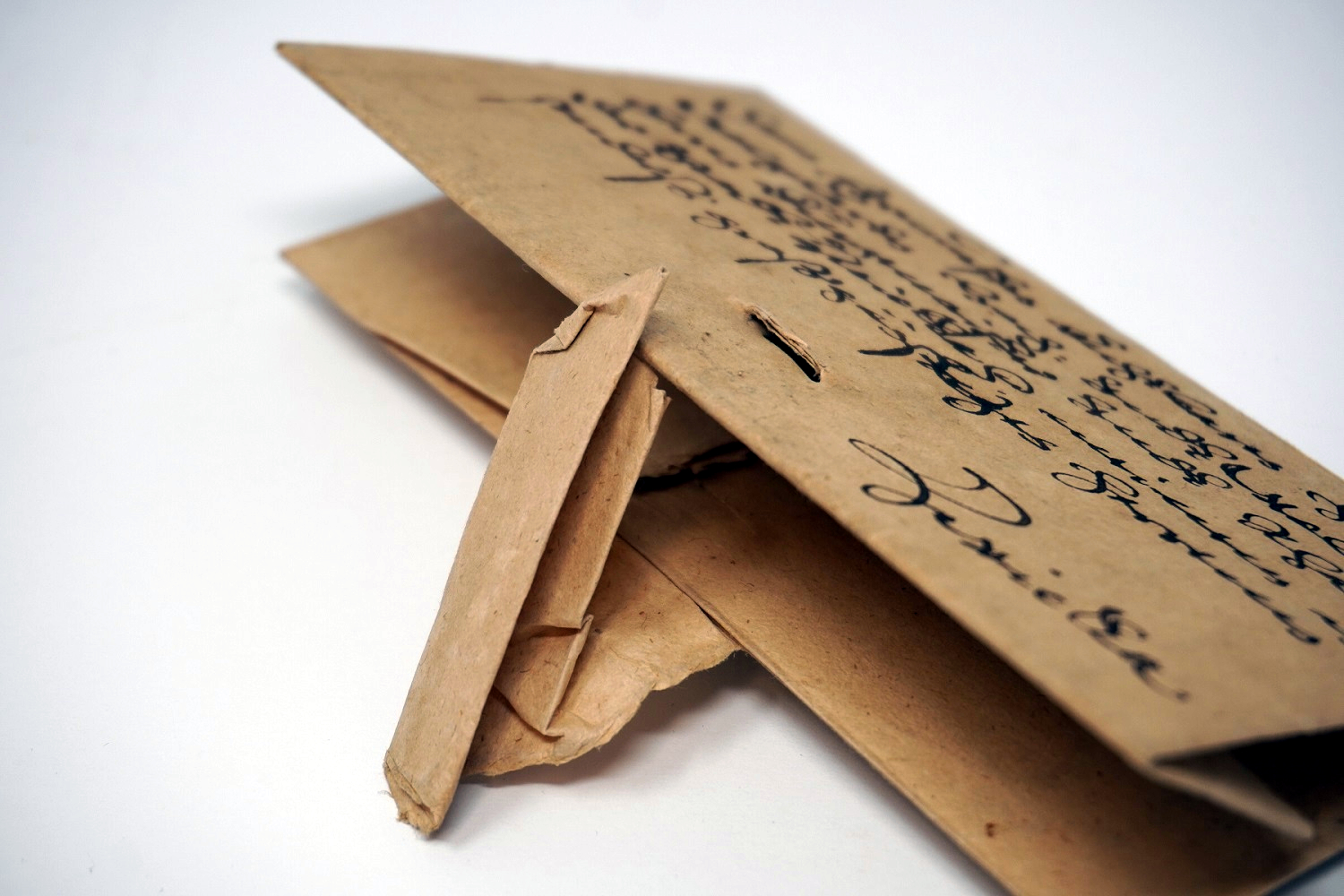
A locked letter from 1603

Letterlocking is the act of folding and securing a written message (such as a letter) on papyrus, parchment, or paper, without requiring it to be contained in an envelope or packet. It is a traditional method of document security that utilizes folding and cutting. The process dates to the 13th century in Western history, corresponding with the availability of flexible writing paper.

Letterlocking is also a discipline focusing on "the materially engineered security and privacy of letters, both as a technology and a historically evolving tradition."

== Method ==
Letterlocking uses small slits, tabs, and holes placed directly into a letter, which combined with folding techniques are used to secure the letter ("letterpacket"), preventing reading the letter without breaking seals or slips, providing a means of tamper resistance and tamper evidence. These folds and holes may be additionally secured with string and sealing wax.

== Varieties ==
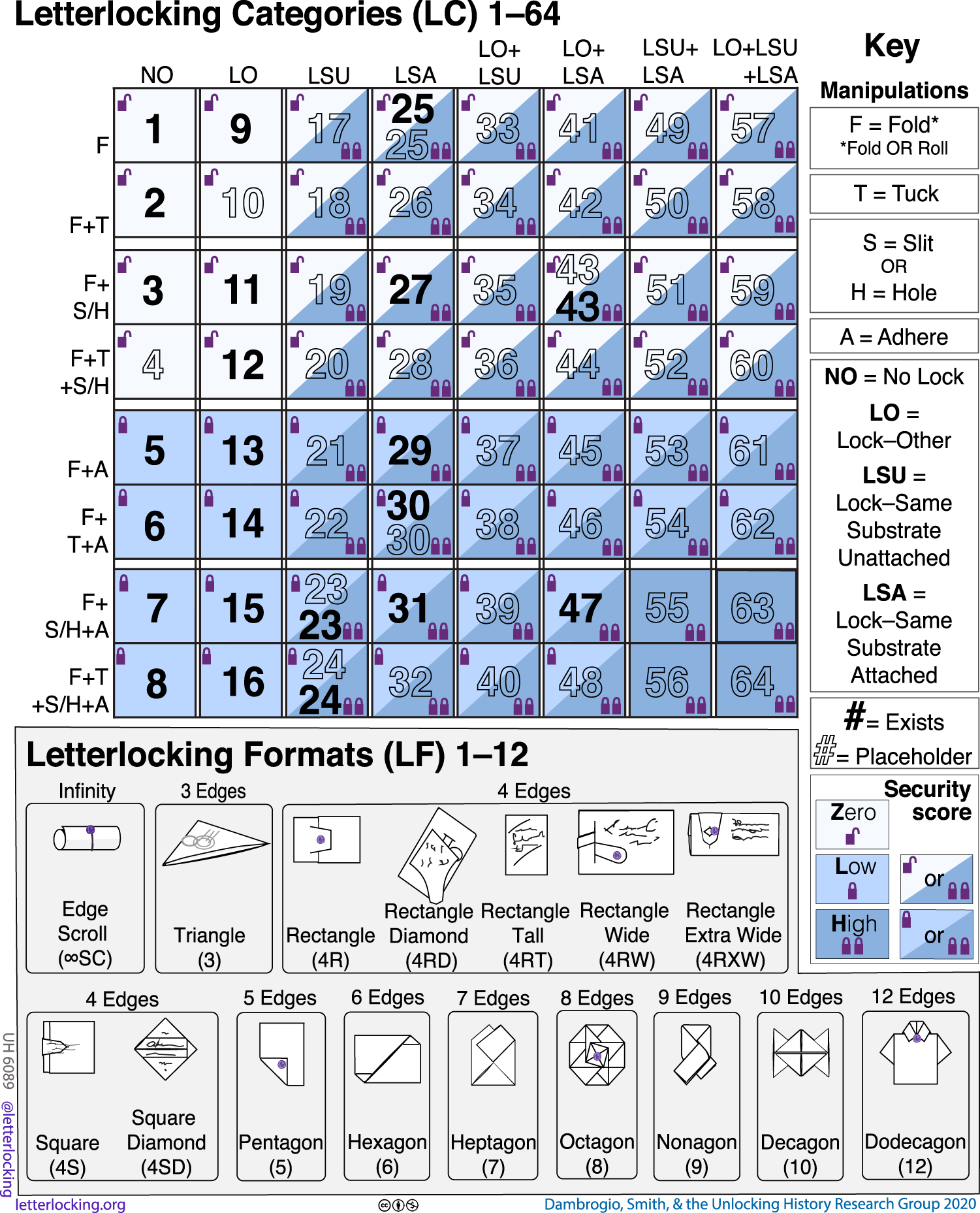
Letterlocking categories 1–64, based on manipulations and assigned security score

A particularly intricate method known as a spiral lock was in use by people of many social backgrounds in early modern Europe, including monarchs Mary Queen of Scots and Elizabeth I of England. The pages of a letter would be folded together to form a packet. A sliver cut from a page but remaining attached at one end would be woven multiple times, back and forth, through short slots cut into the folded pages. The paper would then be moistened so that it would swell, locking the pieces together. The loose end of the sliver would then be pasted down and possibly sealed with wax.

Margaret Douglas, Countess of Lennox, and her daughter-in-law wrote to Mary, Queen of Scots, on 11 November 1575. The materiality of their letter was first described by the 19th-century historian Agnes Strickland, indicating the "cuttings which may be seen in the paper, just like button holes before they are worked" and the probable method of closure, "a broad tress of floss silk was then drawn through all the apertures, and knotted and sealed down. Thus no one could open the square packet without cutting the silk".

A Scottish diplomat in Italy, William Keith of Delny, sent letters to James VI of Scotland in 1595 which would tear in two if not opened with care. In 1603 King James told the Venetian diplomat Giovanni Carlo Scaramelli, with a smile, that he had previously received letters from the Doge of Venice which he could not open without breaking the seal. Scaramelli opened the letter for him.

Intricate letterlocking works contain artistic elements, demonstrating more than a utilitarian purpose. While the use of sealing techniques may have been limited to ecclesiastics and the nobility, letterlocking was historically performed by all classes of writers. An individual could also be recognised by their personal technique of folding, as was the case with Jane Whorwood, of whose letter Charles I of England wrote: "This Note [...] I know, by the fowldings [...] that it is written by [Mrs Whorwood]".

== Collections ==
The Brienne Collection is a postmaster's trunk of undelivered letters from various places in Europe sent to The Hague, the Netherlands, between 1689 and 1706. The letters were held by the postmaster because, at that time, the recipient was required to pay for delivery and the postmaster kept the letters in the hope that the intended recipient would pay for delivery at a later date. These letters were therefore letters for which the intended recipient never paid for delivery and so never received the remaining letters. The trunk contains about 2,600 folded letters, of which about 600 have been unsealed and studied. The collection is held by the Dutch museum Image and Sound The Hague, which encompasses the former Dutch postal museum.

The Envelope and Letter Folds Association (ELFA) is an informal organization of enthusiasts founded in 1988-89 and which at one time had local groups in the Netherlands, Belgium, and Germany.

== Research ==
In March 2021, a group of researchers from the Massachusetts Institute of Technology used computational techniques to "virtually unfold" letters from the Brienne Collection, using technology similar to that used for investigating similarly delicate scrolls, books, and other folded documents. The digitally unfolded letter, sealed since 1697 and secured by eight folds, had been previously scanned using X-ray microtomography (XMT), a technology used in dental and other medical, industrial, and archaeological research. While previous XMT efforts had involved algorithms to analyze and digitally flatten ancient scrolls, this research succeeded in interpreting complex, origami-like folds, and parts of letters slotted through and interlocked with other parts of the letters. The first book-length study, Letterlocking: The Hidden History of the Letter, was published in 2025 by Jana Dambrogio, Daniel Starza Smith, and the Unlocking History Research Group.

== See also ==
- Letter sheet
- Letters close
