= En-Gedi Scroll =

Hebrew parchment found in 1970 at Ein Gedi, Israel

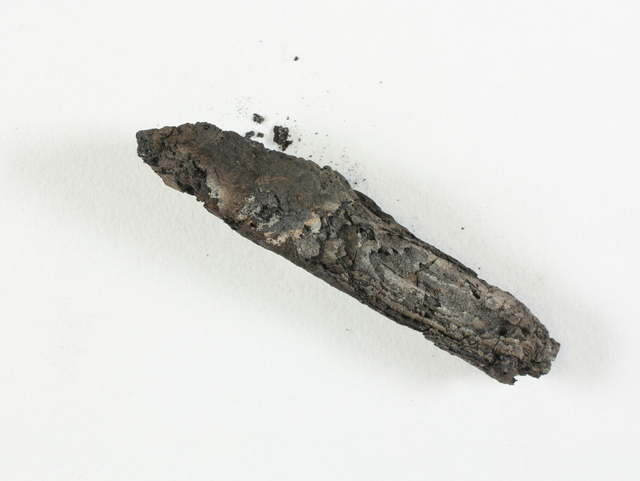
The charred ancient scroll from Ein Gedi

The En-Gedi Scroll, also called the En-Gedi Leviticus Scroll (EGLev) is an ancient Hebrew parchment found in 1970 at Ein Gedi, Israel. Radiocarbon testing dates the scroll to the third or fourth century CE (88.9% certainty for 210–390 CE), although there is disagreement over whether the evidence from the writing itself supports that date. The scroll was discovered to contain a portion of the biblical Book of Leviticus, making it the earliest copy of a Pentateuchal book ever found in a Torah ark.

The deciphered text fragment is identical to what was to become, during the Middle Ages, the standard text of the Hebrew Bible, known as the Masoretic Text, which it precedes by several centuries. Damaged by a fire in approximately 600 CE, the scroll is badly charred and fragmented and required noninvasive scientific and computational techniques to virtually unwrap and read, which was completed in 2015 by a team led by Brent Seales of the University of Kentucky.

== Dating ==
Radiocarbon dating at the Weizmann Institute of a charred fragment presumed to be from the scroll gave a C^{14} age of 1754±40 years. The radiocarbon calibration curve of the time placed this in 235–340 CE with 68% probability and 210–390 CE with 89% probability. This dating was challenged by Ada Yardeni, who proposed on the basis of letter shapes that the scroll should be dated to the second half of the first century CE or the beginning of the second. Drew Longacre disputed Yardeni's analysis, arguing that it was misled by the paucity of comparative material from later centuries. In Longacre's analysis, the paleographical evidence supported the radiocarbon date.

== Text ==
The innermost portion of the scroll contains a large blank area typically placed at the start of a scroll in order to protect it. For this reason, the researchers concluded that Leviticus was the first book on the scroll and that at most three books of the Torah were originally present. However, most of the scroll has been burnt away and only two columns of Leviticus were found.

The text recovered consists of 18 complete lines and 17 partial lines of the first two chapters of Leviticus. It is identical both in consonantal text and paragraph division to the Masoretic Text as exemplified by the medieval Leningrad Codex. This places it on equal footing with a handful of earlier manuscripts found in the Judean Desert but distinct from the Dead Sea Scrolls found at Qumran. If the radiocarbon date is correct, the scroll provides important evidence of the canonicalising of the Masoretic Text during a period for which textual evidence is almost non-existent.

Gary A. Rendsburg noted that the researchers have concluded that by the fourth century CE, there was no halakhic rule prescribing that scrolls used for liturgical purposes must contain the entire Pentateuch, while other statements regarding when this rule came to be observed cannot be made with any degree of certainty.

== Discovery and recovery ==
=== Discovery ===
The En-Gedi Scroll was discovered in a 1970 excavation headed by Dan Barag and Ehud Netzer of the Institute of Archaeology at Hebrew University, and Yosef Porath of the Israel Antiquities Authority (IAA) at the ancient synagogue in Ein Gedi in Israel, the site of an ancient Jewish community. It was found in the burned remains of the ancient synagogue's Torah Ark. Severely damaged by a fire around 600 CE, the scroll appeared as burned, crushed chunks of charcoal. Each disturbance caused the scroll to disintegrate, leaving few options for conservation or restoration. The scroll fragments were preserved by the IAA, although for decades after its discovery the scroll remained in storage due to its severely damaged condition.

=== Recovery ===
The scroll's fragility led scientists to search for non-traditional techniques to reconstruct the text of the document virtually. This search led to the development of a virtual unwrapping technique developed by Prof. W. Brent Seales of the University of Kentucky, which in 2015 allowed scientists to reveal the text contained in the scroll.

The virtual unwrapping process begins with using X-ray microtomography (micro-CT) to scan the damaged scroll. This scan is non-invasive and uses the same technology as a traditional CT scan. Researchers used a high energy x-ray beam to pass through the depth of the scroll. Each material absorbs the X-ray radiation differently, whereby the scroll will absorb it minimally but more than the empty space around it, and the ink will absorb it significantly more than the unwritten scroll areas around it.

This creates the sharp contrast seen between the text and the scroll in the final images. When the scroll completes a full rotation in regard to the X-ray source, the computer generates a 2D slice of the cross-section, and performing this iteratively allows to build up a 3D volumetric scan describing the density as a function of the position inside the scroll. The only data needed for the virtual unwrapping process is this volumetric scan, so after this point the scroll was safely returned to its protective archive.

The goal of the virtual unwrapping process is to determine the layered structure of the scroll and try to peel back each layer while keeping track of which voxel is being peeled and what density it corresponds to. By transforming the voxels from a 3D volumetric scan to a 2D image, the writing on this inside is revealed to the viewer. This process happens in three steps: segmentation, texturing and flattening.

== See also ==
- Herculaneum papyri
  - PHerc. Paris. 4
- Torah scroll
