= Seated Hermes =

Statue

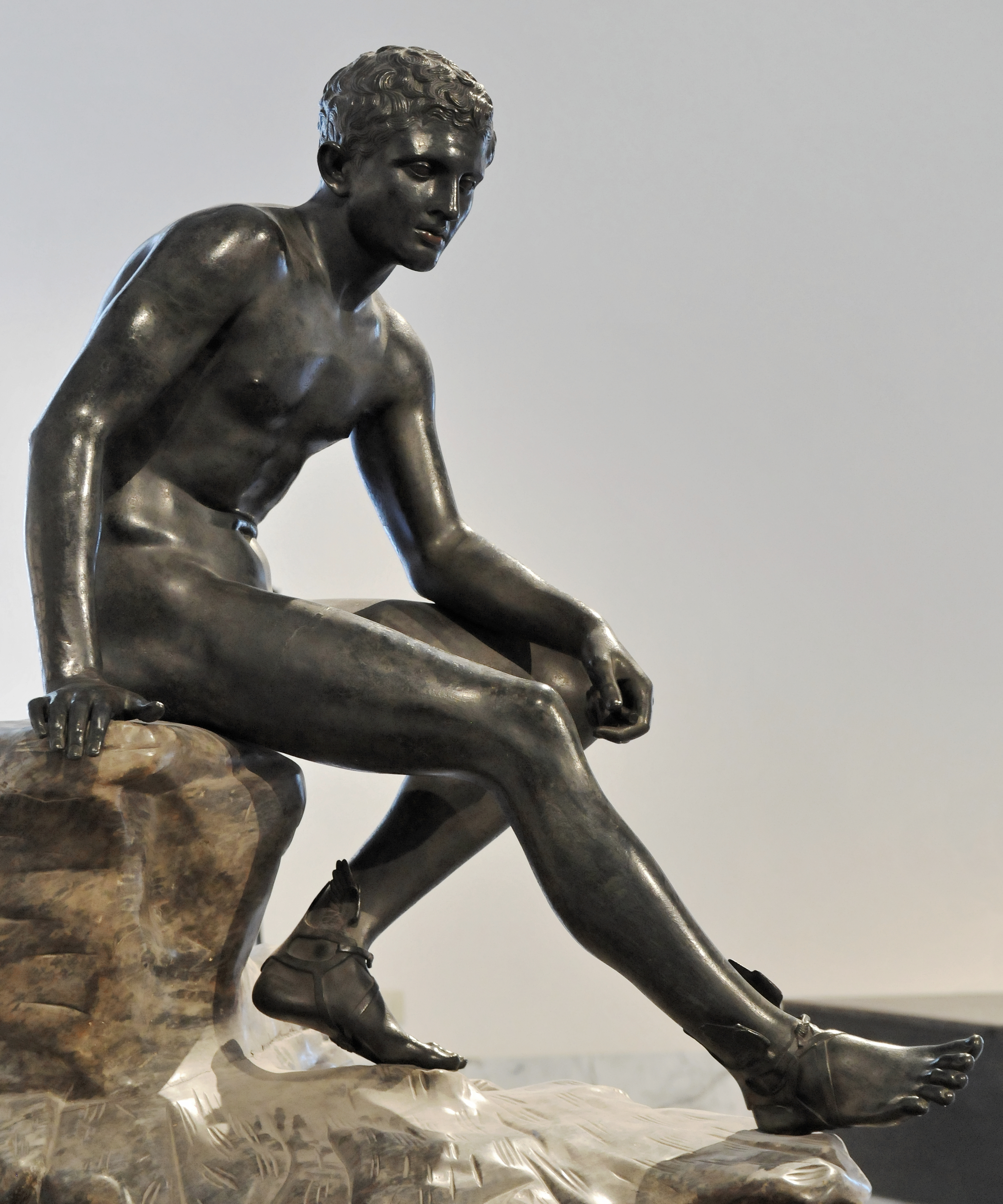
Seated Hermes, or Mercury in repose.

The bronze Seated Hermes, found at the Villa of the Papyri in Herculaneum in 1758, is at the National Archaeological Museum of Naples. "This statue was probably the most celebrated work of art discovered at Herculaneum and Pompeii in the eighteenth century", Francis Haskell and Nicholas Penny have observed, once four large engravings reproducing it had appeared in Le Antichità di Ercolano, 1771. To protect it from Napoleonic depredations, it was packed into one of the fifty-two cases of antiquities and works of art that accompanied the Bourbon flight to Palermo in 1798. It was once again in the royal villa at Portici in 1816 (Haskell and Penny 1981:269).

Martin Robertson (1975, vol I:474) classifies it as a Roman copy, made before AD 79, of a Greek bronze original of the late fourth or early third century BC, in the tradition of Lysippos, whose name has been invoked in connection with the sculpture since its first reappearance. Margarete Bieber classifies it as "belonging to the school of Lysippos", which would place the creation of its original in the fourth century BC. Many bronze statues posed on actual rocks must have been set up in late Hellenistic and Roman gardens, where, Brunilde Sismondo Ridgway suggests, natural boulders "increased the idyllic aspect of the composition." The Hermes rests his hand casually on the (restored) rock, integrating the composition.
