= Herculaneum papyri =

Scrolls from ancient Italy

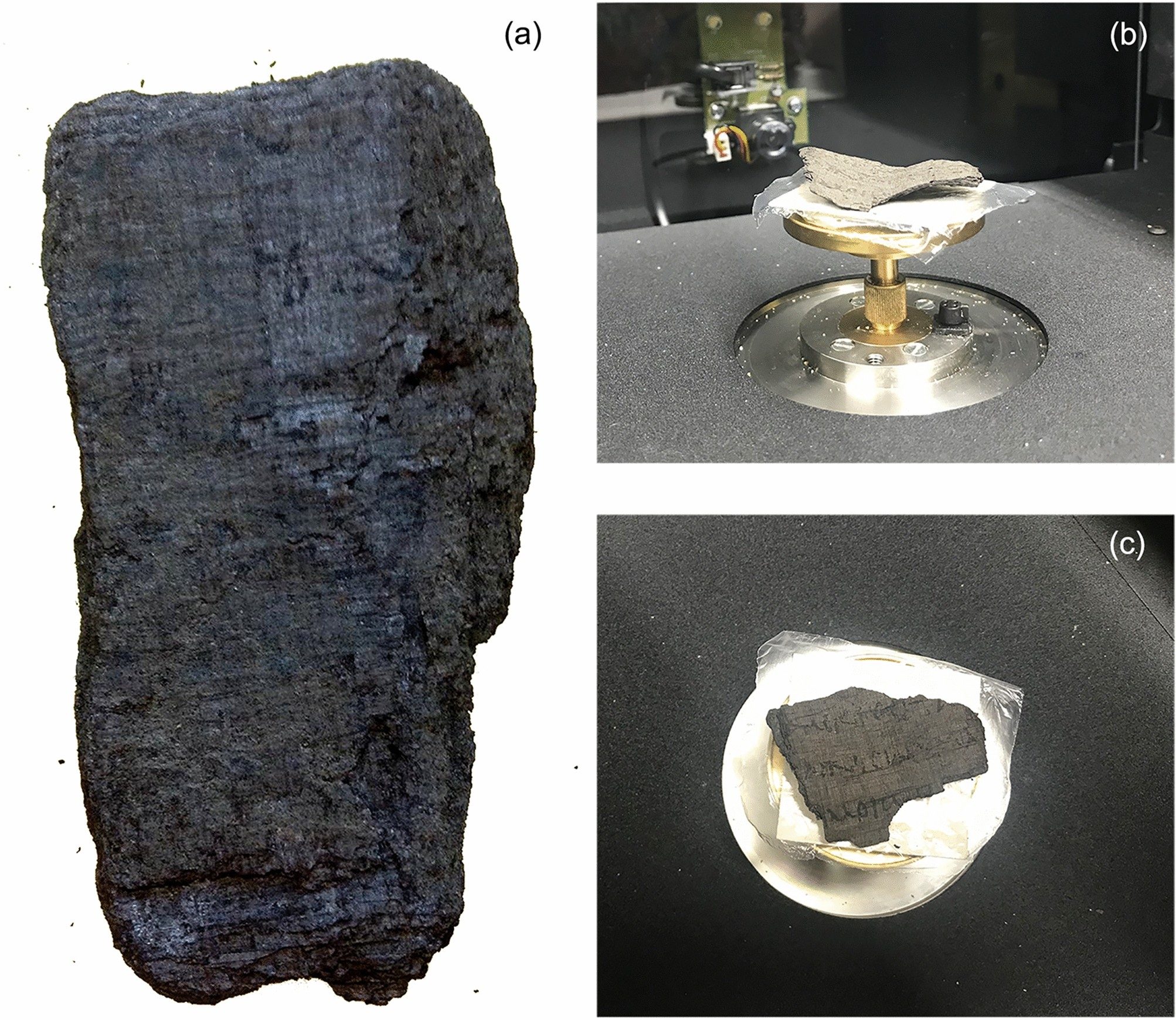
Papyrus fragments PHerc.1103 (a) and PHerc.110 (b,c). Image contrast and brightness were enhanced to better visualize the details visible to the naked eye on their external surface.

The Herculaneum papyri are more than 1,800 scrolls of papyrus discovered in the 18th century in the Villa of the Papyri in Herculaneum. They had been carbonized when the villa was engulfed by the eruption of Mount Vesuvius in 79 AD.

The papyri, containing a number of Greek philosophical texts, come from the only surviving library from antiquity that exists in its entirety. In its current state, reading of the scrolls is extremely difficult and can risk destroying the information it holds. Techniques to decipher the writings on the scrolls are still being developed. For the first time, researchers recovered all the surviving text from a single scroll in 2026.

The majority of classical texts referred to by other classical authors are lost, and there is hope that the continuing work on the library scrolls will discover some of these. For example, as many as 44 works discovered were written by the 1st-century BC Epicurean philosopher and poet Philodemus, a resident of Herculaneum, who possibly formed the library, or whose library was incorporated in it.

== Discovery ==
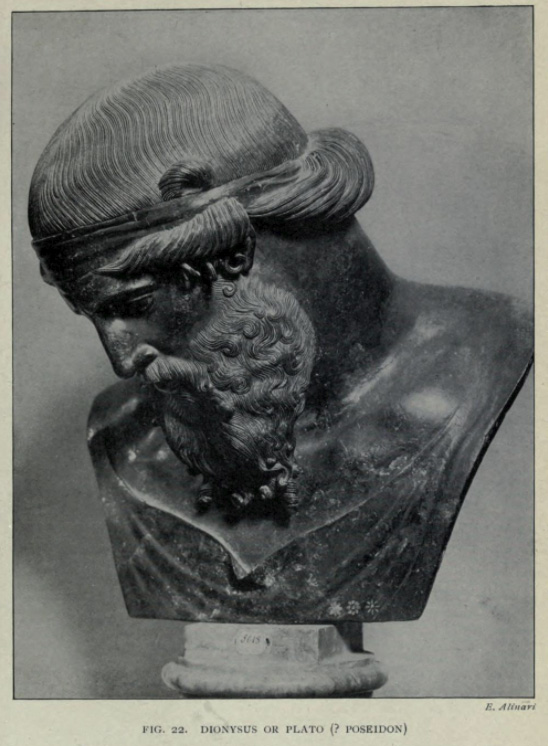
Dionysus, Plato, or Poseidon sculpture excavated at the Villa of the Papyri

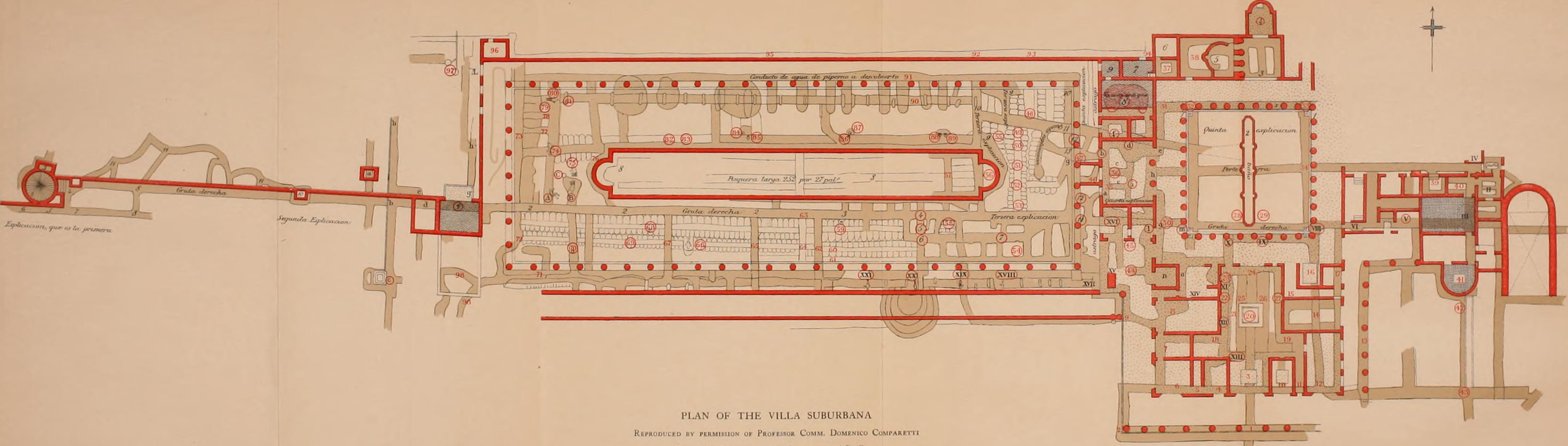
A map of the Villa of the Papyri

Due to the eruption of Mount Vesuvius in 79 AD, bundles of scrolls were carbonized by the intense heat of the pyroclastic flows. This intense parching took place over an extremely short period of time, in a room deprived of oxygen, resulting in the scrolls' carbonization into compact and highly fragile blocks. They were then preserved by the layers of cement-like rock.

In 1752, workmen of the Bourbon royal family accidentally discovered what is now known as the Villa of the Papyri. There may still be a lower section of the Villa's collection that remains buried.

Ethel Ross Barker noted in her 1908 Buried Herculaneum:

Appearance of the rolls. — A large number of papyri, after being buried eighteen centuries, have been found in the Villa named after them. In appearance the rolls resembled lumps of charcoal; and many were thrown away as such. Some were much lighter in colour. Finally, a faint trace of letters was seen on one of the blackened masses, which was found to be a roll of papyrus, disintegrated by decay and damp, full of holes, cut, crushed, and crumpled. The papyri were found at a depth of about 120 feet (37 metres).

The woodwork of some of the presses that had contained them dropped to dust on exposure and many rolls were found lying about loosely. Others were still on the shelves. Locality of the discovery. — They were found in four places on four occasions. The first were found in the autumn of 1752, fourteen years after the first discovery of Herculaneum, in and near the tablinum, and only numbered some 21 volumes and fragments, contained in two wooden cases. In the spring of 1753, 11 papyri were found in a room just south of the tablinum, and in the summer of the same year, 250 were found in a room to the north. In the spring and summer of the following year, 337 Greek papyri and 18 Latin papyri were found in the Library. Nothing of any importance was discovered after this date.

The numbers given here exclude mere fragments. Including every tiny fragment found, the catalogues give 1756 manuscripts discovered up to 1855, while subsequent discoveries bring the total up to 1806. Of these, 341 were found almost entire, 500 were merely charred fragments, and the remaining 965 were in every intermediate state of disintegration.

Treatment of the rolls. — No one knew how to deal with such strange material. Weber, the engineer, and Paderni, the keeper of the Museum at Portici, were not experts in palaeography and philology, which sciences were, indeed, almost in their infancy one hundred and fifty years ago. There were no official publications concerning the papyri till forty years after their discovery, and our information is of necessity incomplete, inexact and contradictory.

Father Antonio Piaggio's machine. — Through this inevitable ignorance of the time, a larger number of the rolls were destroyed than the difficulties of the case necessitated. Many had been thrown away as mere charcoal; some were destroyed in extracting them from the lava in which they were embedded. In the attempt to discover their contents, several were split in two longitudinally. Finally, that ingenious Italian monk, Father Piaggio, invented a very simple machine for unrolling the manuscripts by means of silk threads attached to the edge of the papyrus. Of course this method destroyed the beginning of all the papyri, sometimes the end could not be found, and the papyri were in a terrible state of decay.

=== Excavations ===
Anybody who focuses on the ancient world is always going to be excited to get even one paragraph, one chapter, more... The prospect of getting hundreds of books more is staggering.
Roger Macfarlane

In the 18th century, the first digs began. The excavation appeared closer to mining projects, as mineshafts were dug, and horizontal subterranean galleries were installed. Workers would place objects in baskets and send them back up.

With the backing of Charles VII of Naples (1716–1788), Roque Joaquín de Alcubierre headed the systematic excavation of Herculaneum with Karl Jakob Weber.

Barker noted in her 1908 Buried Herculaneum, "By the orders of Francis I land was purchased, and in 1828 excavations were begun in two parts 150 feet [46 m] apart, under the direction of the architect. Carlo Bonucci. In the year 1868 still further purchases of land were made, and excavations were carried on in an eastward direction till 1875. The total area now open measures 300 by 150 perches (1510 by 756 meters). The limits of the excavations to the north and east respectively are the modern streets of Vico di Mare and Vico Ferrara. It is here only that any portion of ancient Herculaneum may be seen in the open day."

It is uncertain how many papyri were originally found as many of the scrolls were destroyed by workmen or when scholars extracted them from the volcanic tuff.

The official list amounts to 1,814 rolls and fragments, of which 1,756 had been discovered by 1855. In the 90s it was reported that the inventory now comprises 1,826 papyri, with more than 340 are almost complete, about 970 are partly decayed and partly decipherable, and more than 500 are merely charred fragments.

In a 2016 open letter, academics asked the Italian authorities to consider new excavations, since it is assumed that many more papyri may be buried at the site. Authors argue that "the volcano may erupt again and put the villa effectively beyond reach" and "Posterity will not forgive us if we squander this chance. The excavation must proceed."

In April 2024, a papyrologist at the University of Pisa found information about Plato's burial place in the Herculaneum papyri by the usage of infrared and X-ray scanners.

=== Post-excavation history ===
In 1802, King Ferdinand IV of Naples offered six rolls to Napoleon Bonaparte in a diplomatic move. In 1803, along with other treasures, the scrolls were transported by Francesco Carelli. Upon receiving the gift, Bonaparte then gave the scrolls to Institut de France under charge of Gaspard Monge and Vivant Denon.

In 1810, eighteen unrolled papyri were given to George IV, four of which he presented to the Bodleian Library; the rest are now mainly in the British Library.

== Unrolling ==
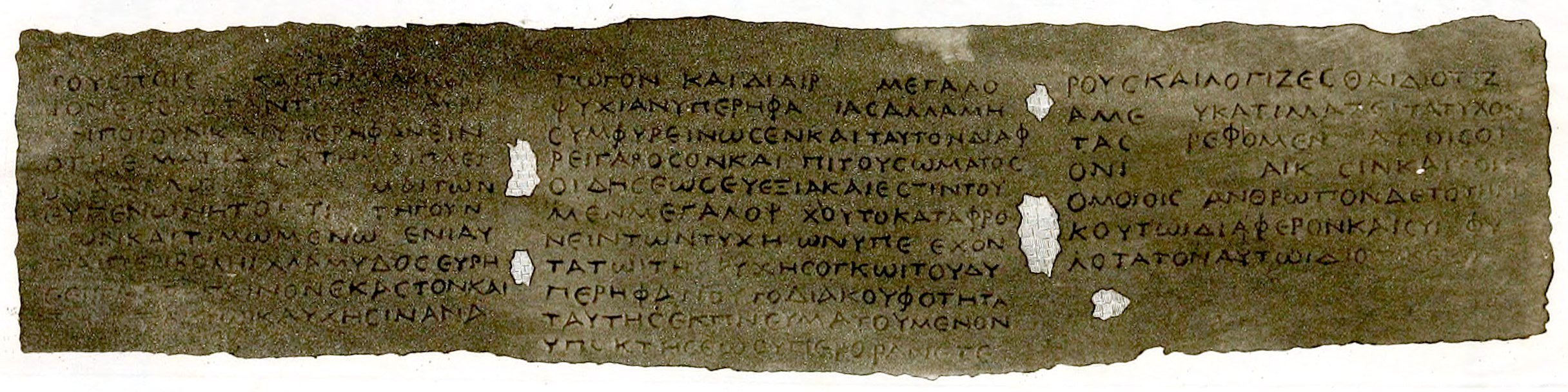
Carbonized paper, found with other images in an 1858 published book by Giacomo Castrucci

Since their discovery, previous attempts used rose water, liquid mercury, vegetable gas, sulfuric compounds, papyrus juice, or a mixture of ethanol, glycerin, and warm water, in hopes to make scrolls readable. According to Antonio de Simone and Richard Janko, at first the papyri were mistaken for carbonized tree branches, some perhaps even thrown away or burnt to make heat.

What we see is that the ink, which was essentially carbon based, is not very different from the carbonised papyrus.

— Dr. Vito Mocella

Opening a scroll would often damage or destroy the scroll completely. If a scroll had been successfully opened, the original ink – exposed to air – would begin to fade. In addition, this form of unrolling often would leave pages stuck together, omitting or destroying additional information.

With X-ray micro-computed tomography (micro-CT), no ink can be seen, as carbon-based ink is not visible on carbonized papyrus.

=== Physical unrolling ===
==== Early attempts ====
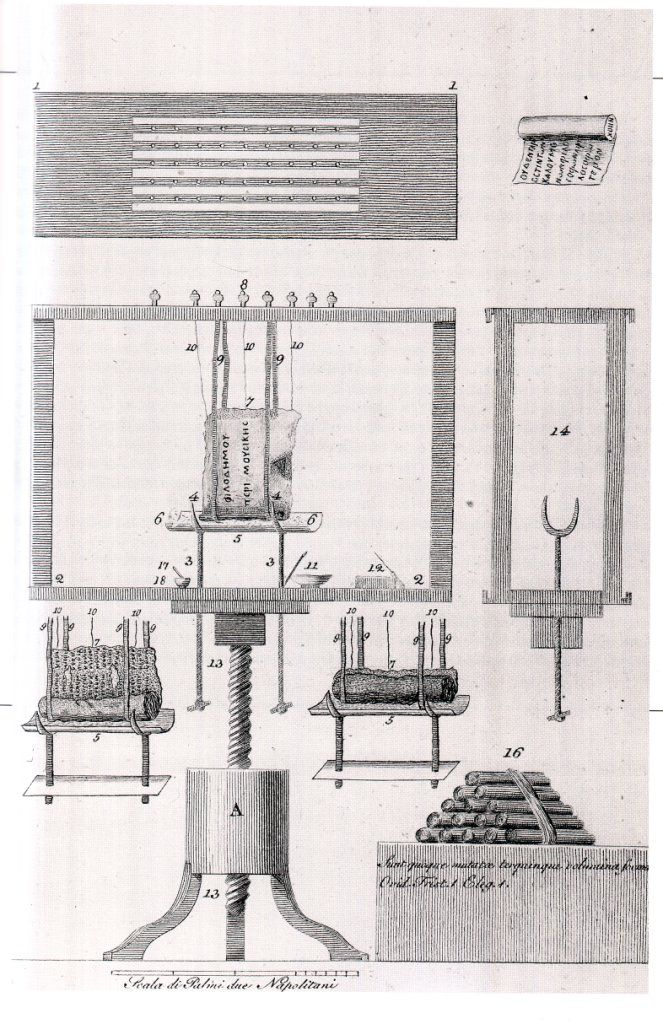
Abbot Piaggio's machine was used to unroll scrolls as early as 1756 in the Vatican Library.

Following the discovery of the Herculaneum papyri in 1752, following the advice of Bernardo Tanucci, King Charles VII of Naples established a commission to study them.

Possibly the first attempts to read the scrolls were made by the artist Camillo Paderni who was in charge of recovered items. Paderni used the method of slicing scrolls in half, copying readable text, by removing papyri layers. This transcription procedure was used for hundreds of scrolls, and in the process destroyed them.

In 1756, Abbot Piaggio, conserver of ancient manuscripts in the Vatican Library, used a machine he also invented, to unroll the first scroll, which took four years (millimeters per day). The results were then copied (since the writing disappeared: see above), reviewed by Hellenist academics, and then corrected once more, if necessary, by the unrolling/copying team.

In 1802, King Ferdinand IV of Naples appointed Rev. John Hayter to assist the process.

From 1802 to 1806, Hayter unrolled and partly deciphered some 200 papyri. These copies are held in the Bodleian Library, where they are known as the "Oxford Facsimiles of the Herculaneum Papyri".

In January 1816, Pierre-Claude Molard and Raoul Rochette led an attempt to unroll one papyrus with a replica of Abbot Piaggio's machine. However, the entire scroll was destroyed without any information being obtained.

From 1819 until 1820, Humphry Davy was commissioned by the prince regent George IV to work on the Herculaneum papyri. Although it is considered that he had only limited success, Davy's chemical method, which used chlorine, managed to partially unroll 23 manuscripts.

In 1877, a papyrus was taken to a laboratory in the Louvre. An attempt to unravel it was made with a "small mill", but it was unsuccessful and was mostly destroyed, leaving only a quarter intact.

By the middle of the 20th century, only 585 rolls or fragments had been completely unrolled, and 209 unrolled in part. Of the unrolled papyri, about 200 had been deciphered and published, and about 150 only deciphered.

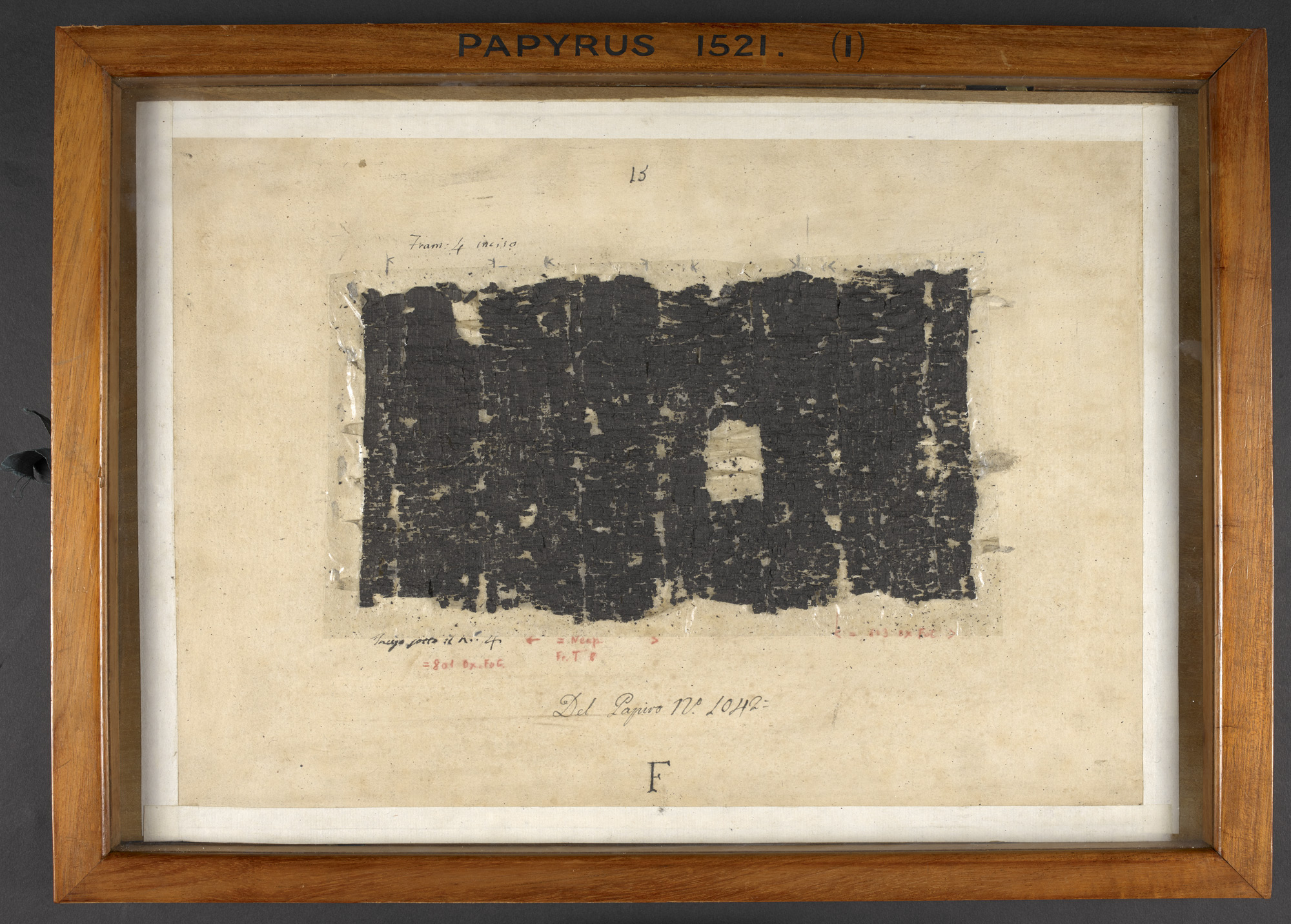
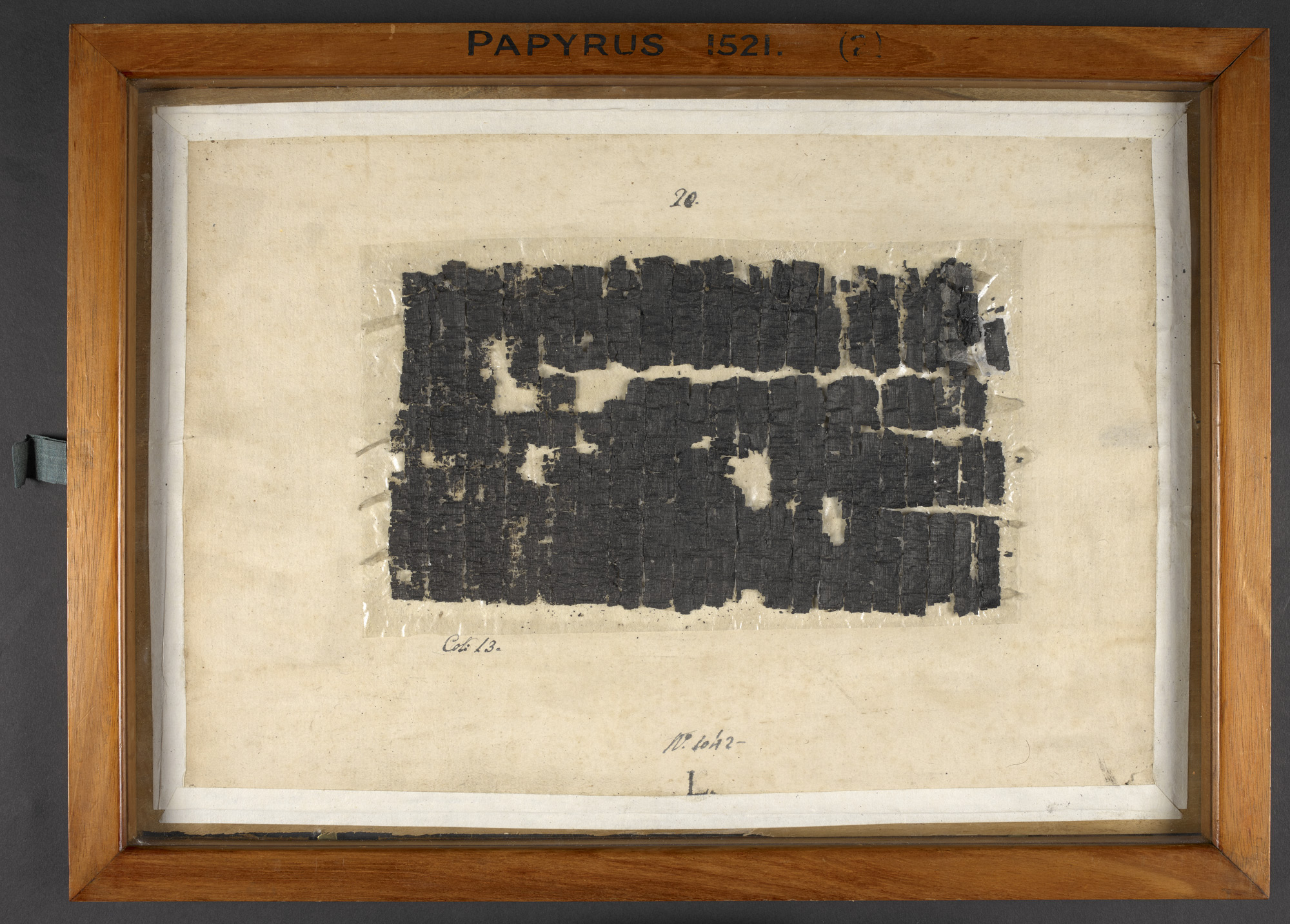
Heruclaneum Papyrus 1521, British Library. The seven fragments, recovered and published in Piaggio's workshop in Italy, were part of a gift containing a number of scrolls that King Ferdinand IV of Naples had sent to George IV of Britain in exchange for a royal giraffe for his private zoo. The scroll contains a portion of a work by the ancient Greek philosopher Epicurus (341–270 BC).

==== Modern attempts ====
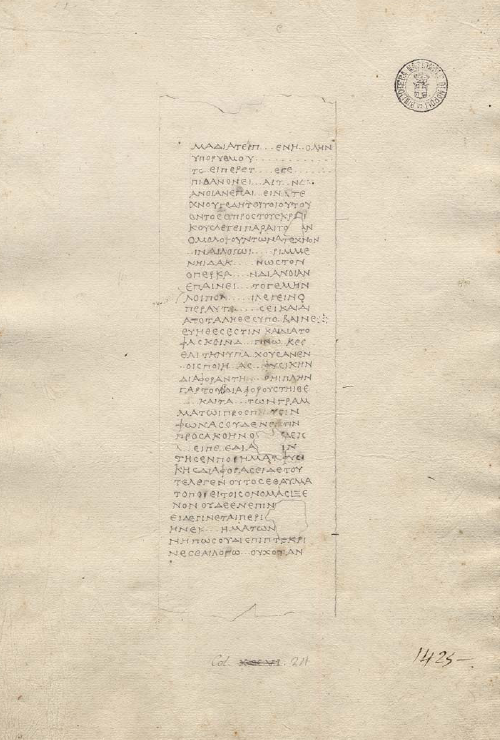
Herculaneum papyrus 1425 (De poem), drawn by Giuseppe Casanova, c. 1807

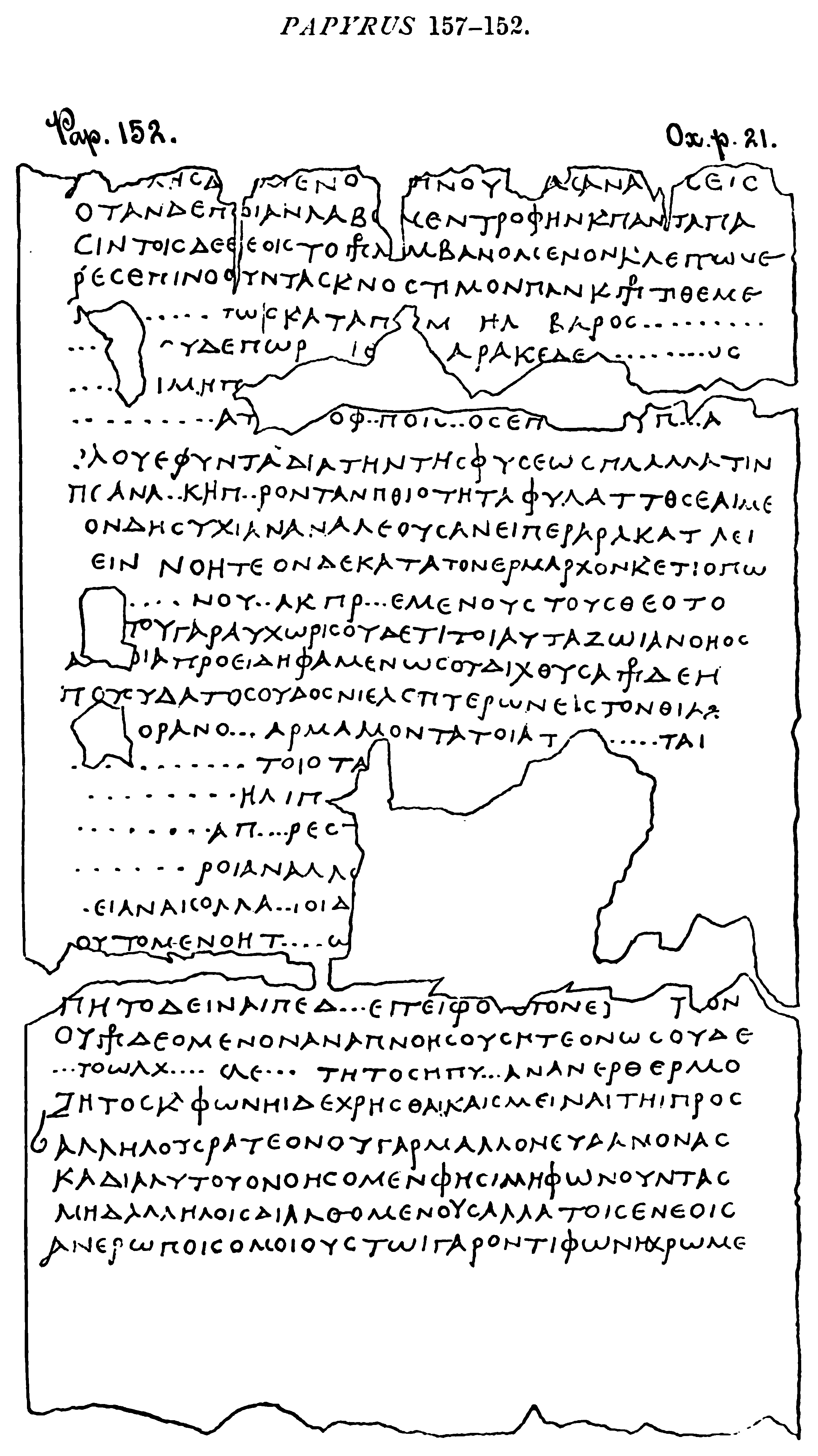
A copy of identifiable text of papyrus 152–157

The bulk of the preserved manuscripts are housed in the Office of Herculaneum papyri in National Library of Naples.

In 1969, Marcello Gigante founded the creation of the International Center for the Study of the Herculaneum Papyri (Centro Internazionale per lo Studio dei Papiri Ercolanesi; CISPE). With the intention of working toward the resumption of the excavation of the Villa of the Papyri, and promoting the renewal of studies of the Herculaneum texts, the institution began a new method of unrolling. Using the 'Oslo' peeling method, the CISPE team separated individual layers of the papyri. One of the scrolls exploded into 300 parts, and another did similarly but to a lesser extent.

Since 1999, the unrolled papyri have been digitized at Brigham Young University by applying multi-spectral imaging (MSI). International experts and prominent scholars participated in the project. On 4 June 2011 it was announced the task of digitizing 1,600 Herculaneum papyri had been completed. MSI helps spot ink because the ink and the charred papyrus have different reflectivities in the 950 nm infrared band. The images are not actually "multispectral", but consist only of data in this 950-nm band.

In 2019, a multinational European team reported that SWIR HSI (shortwave-infrared hyperspectral imaging), which combines several bands in the 1000–2500 nm range, detects ink on unrolled papyri better than the 950 nm technique does.

=== Virtual unrolling ===
Several research groups have proposed to unroll the scrolls virtually, using X-ray phase-contrast tomography (XPCT, "phase-contrast CT"), possibly with a synchrotron light source. The proposed method has four steps: volumetric scanning, segmentation, layered texture generation and restoration.

Since 2007, a team working with Institut de Papyrologie and a group of scientists from Kentucky have been using X-rays and nuclear magnetic resonance to analyze the artifacts.

In 2009, the Institut de France in conjunction with the French National Centre for Scientific Research imaged two intact Herculaneum papyri using X-ray micro-computed tomography (micro-CT) to reveal the interior structures of the scrolls. The team heading the project estimated that if the scrolls were fully unwound they would be between 11 and 15 metres (36 and 49 ft) long. The internal structure of the rolls was revealed to be too compact and convoluted for the automated algorithms the team had developed. Unfortunately, no ink could be seen on the small samples imaged, because carbon-based inks are not visible on the carbonized scrolls. However, some scrolls were written with ink containing lead.

In September 2016, Brent Seales, Professor, Department of Computer Science at the University of Kentucky, successfully used virtual unrolling to read the text of a charred parchment from Israel, the En-Gedi Scroll.

==== Process ====
The virtual unrolling process begins with a volumetric scan of the damaged scroll. Such scans are non-invasive, and generate a virtual 3D model of the scroll in which ink can be distinguished from paper. After the scan, the unrolling process consists only of manipulation of the data so obtained, so the scroll is returned to the archive. This also affords researchers the flexibility to select for scanning methods which yield the greatest contrast between ink and paper and to quickly adapt to improved scanning methods as they develop. In the case of the Herculaneum papyri, the volumetric scan used phase-contrast CT.

The Herculaneum papyri were written using a carbon-based ink, the chemical composition of which is extremely similar to that of the surrounding carbonized parchment. This poses an obstacle to standard imaging techniques like CT scanning, which distinguish parts of an object according to their absorption and emission properties. However, the presence of ink at a particular point on the parchment results in the scroll being slightly thicker at that point than in its immediate vicinity. Consequently, suitability of a scanning technique for unrolling of the Herculaneum papyri depends largely on its ability to resolve this difference. Phase-contrast CT accomplishes this because radiation passing through a material will undergo a phase shift which depends on the material's thickness; however, micro-CT is also considered a suitable technique by virtue of its sheer resolution.

The virtual model produced by the scan records the composition of the scroll at an array of small regions in space called voxels or volume-pixels. The goal from this point is to construct a two-dimensional representation of the unrolled scroll in such a way that the voxels corresponding to points on the rolled-up scroll can be identified with corresponding pixels on the constructed unrolling. This process happens in three steps: segmentation, texturing and flattening.

In 2018, Seales demonstrated a readable virtual unrolling of parts of a Herculaneum papyrus (P.Herc. 118) from the Bodleian Library, at Oxford University, which was given by King Ferdinand of Naples to the Prince of Wales in 1810. The imaging method Seales used involved a handheld scanner called an Artec Space Spider. In the same year, he demonstrated a readable unrolling of another Herculaneum scroll, with help of the particle accelerator Diamond Light Source; through an X-ray imaging technique, ink containing trace amounts of lead was detected. Prior to this, he demonstrated a successful virtual unrolling without detecting ink on Herculaneum scrolls.

==== Vesuvius Challenge ====
In 2023, Nat Friedman, Daniel Gross, and computer scientist Brent Seales announced the Vesuvius Challenge, a competition to "decipher Herculaneum scrolls using 3D X-ray software". The Vesuvius Challenge offered a $700,000 grand prize to be awarded to the first team that could extract four passages of text from two intact scrolls using 3D X-ray scans.

On 12 October 2023, the project awarded $40,000 to Luke Farritor, a 21-year-old computer science student at the University of Nebraska, for successfully detecting the first word in an unopened scroll: porphyras (Ancient Greek: ΠΟΡΦΥΡΑϹ, lit. 'purple'). With this milestone "first word" award included, the project has awarded $260,000 in total for segmentation tooling and ink detection (from segmented volumes).

On 5 February 2024, the project awarded its 2023 Grand Prize of $700,000 to the winning team and $50,000 each to three runner-up teams for successfully revealing 5% of one scroll, and announced its goal for 2024 of revealing 90% of the four scrolls that it has fully scanned. The uncovered text is believed to be a previously unknown text of Philodemus, "centered on the pleasures of music and food and their effects on the senses".

In 2025, the scans of the scrolls that were provided to participants in the Vesuvius Challenge for the purpose of fully reading them are Scroll 1 (PHerc. Paris. 4), from the Institut de France, which is 5% read, Scroll 2 (PHerc. Paris 3), from the Institut de France, Scroll 3 (PHerc. 332), from the Biblioteca Nazionale di Napoli, a smaller scroll known as the midollo (marrow), left over from attempts to physically unroll the larger original scroll, Scroll 4 (PHerc. 1667), from the Biblioteca Nazionale di Napoli, similar in size to Scroll 3, and Scroll 5 (PHerc. 172), from the Bodleian Library in Oxford, similar in size to Scroll 1.

In June 2026, the Vesuvius Challenge team announced that PHerc. 1667, known within the project as "Scroll 4", had been virtually unwrapped and read end-to-end. A project preprint described the work as the first complete virtual unwrapping and extended reading of a rolled Herculaneum papyrus. In the PHerc. 1667, 22 columns of text were recovered, containing "a Stoic philosophical treatise that may be attributable to Chrysippus". Besides PHerc. 1667, the team were able to read the title and author of PHerc. 139: Philodemus, On Gods, Book 8.

== Significance ==
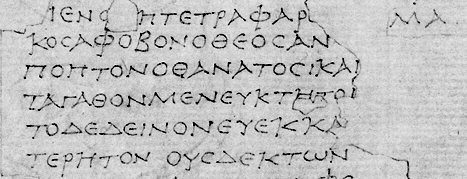
A papyrus copy depicting the Epicurean tetrapharmakos in Philodemus' Adversus Sophistas – (P.Herc.1005), col. 5

Until the middle of the 18th century, the only papyri known were a few survivals from medieval times. Most likely, these rolls never would have survived the Mediterranean climate and would have crumbled or been lost. Indeed, all these rolls have come from the only surviving library from antiquity that exists in its entirety.

These papyri contain a large number of Greek philosophical texts. Large parts of Books XIV, XV, XXV, and XXVIII of the magnum opus of Epicurus, On Nature and works by early followers of Epicurus are also represented among the papyri. Of the rolls, 44 have been identified as the work of Philodemus of Gadara, an Epicurean philosopher and poet. The manuscript "PHerc.Paris.2" contains part of Philodemus' On Vices and Virtues.

The Stoic philosopher Chrysippus is attested to have written over 700 works, all of them lost, with the exception of a few fragments quoted by other authors. Segments of his works On Providence and Logical Questions were found among the papyri; a third work of his may have been recovered from the charred rolls.

Parts of a poem on the Battle of Actium have also survived in the library.

In May 2018, it was reported that fragments of the lost work Histories by Seneca the Elder had been found on a papyrus scroll (PHerc. 1067).

In February 2023, classical scholar Richard Janko announced that he and Seales' team, assisted by artificial intelligence, had managed to read a small part of one heavily damaged, previously unreadable Herculaneum papyrus. The text appeared to be part of a lost work about Alexander the Great and the Diadochi.

In April 2024, the research of a papyrologist at the University of Pisa uncovered details about Plato's burial site from the Herculaneum papyri using infrared and X-ray scanning techniques. This research revealed that Plato's tomb was situated within a garden designated for him at the Platonic school, close to the Mouseion dedicated to the muses.

== See also ==
- Afghan Geniza – collection of Jewish papyri fragments found in Afghanistan
- Ancient Greek literature
- Cairo Geniza – similar cache of ancient religious and secular documents
- Conservation issues of Pompeii and Herculaneum
- Ercolano
- Dunhuang manuscripts – similar cache of ancient religious and secular documents
- Elephantine papyri and ostraca – similar cache of ancient religious and secular documents
- Friends of Herculaneum Society
- Genizah
- Oxyrhynchus Papyri
- Timbuktu manuscripts
