= House of Julia Felix =

Large Roman villa in Pompeii

Coordinates: 40°45′6.74″N 14°29′35.84″E

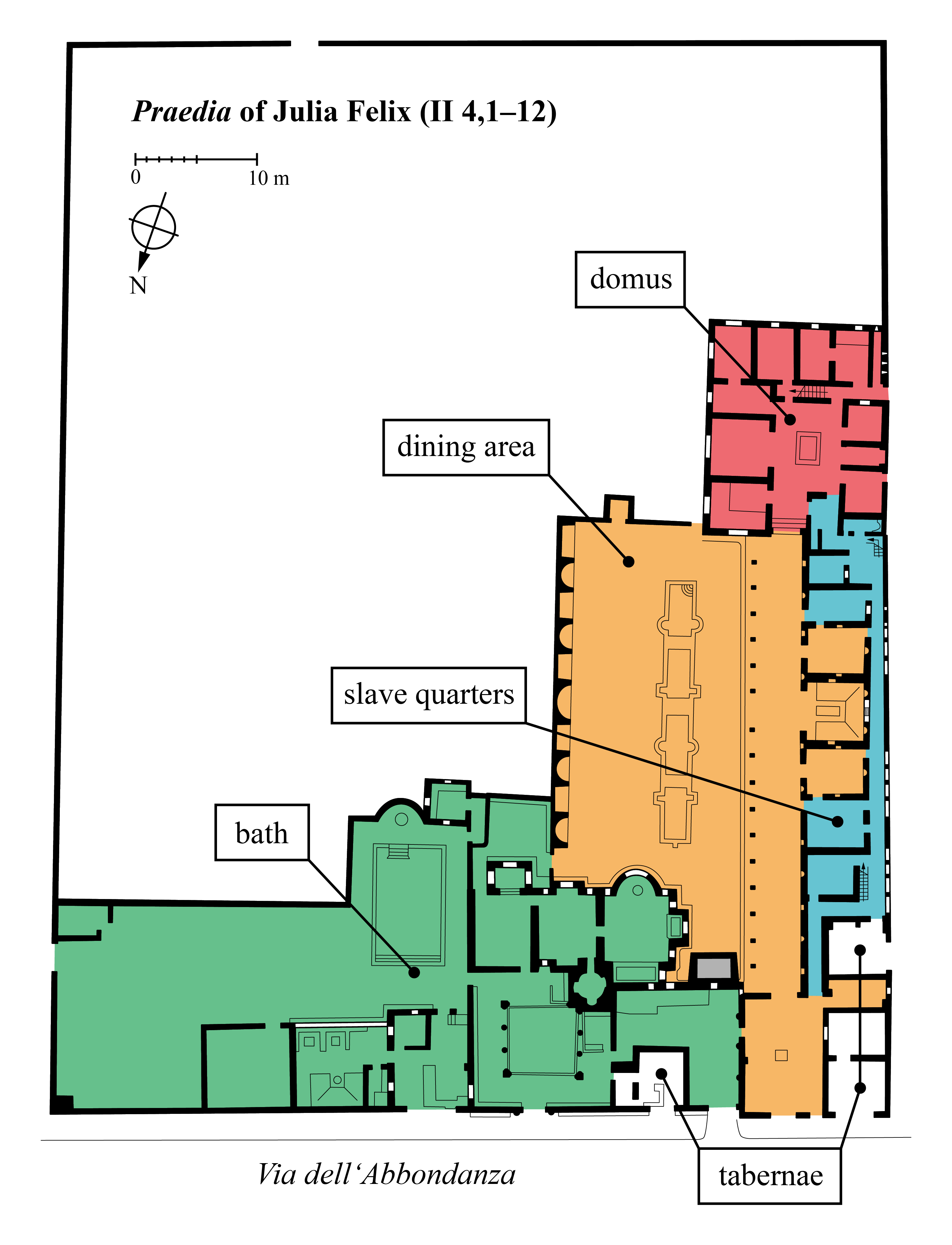
Functional areas in the property of Julia Felix

Pompeii map showing location of House of Julia Felix

The House of Julia Felix, also referred to as the praedia (Latin for an estate, or land) of Julia Felix, is a large Roman property on the Via dell'Abbondanza in the city of Pompeii. It was originally the residence of Julia Felix, who converted portions of it to apartments available for rent and other parts for public use after the major earthquake in 62 AD, a precursor to the eruption of Mount Vesuvius in 79 AD that destroyed Pompeii.

Archaeological excavations began in 1755 and the remains of the House of Julia Felix can be visited today.

== Background ==
Julia Felix's property took up two entire insula, or blocks of land, at the height of her ownership and business. After the 62 AD earthquake, she converted it into luxurious baths and leisure gardens for public use, as well as apartments for rent.

Scholars disagree on Julia Felix's upbringing and the ways in which she inherited the money needed to create a villa; some believe Julia Felix was a "low-born, illegitimate daughter of Spurius", others believe she was descended from imperial freedmen. Renting out her villa established herself as a property owner, businesswoman, and public figure in Pompeii. During Julia Felix's lifetime, laws were implemented limiting women from owning property without a male figure or guardian. Some Roman women were able to own land and other types of property if they were independent of their fathers, husbands, or male guardians. If legal guardians were required, they would have to approve actions involving the transferring of women's property. Elite women were able to bypass the need for a guardian in property ownership and property transfer.

== Architecture ==
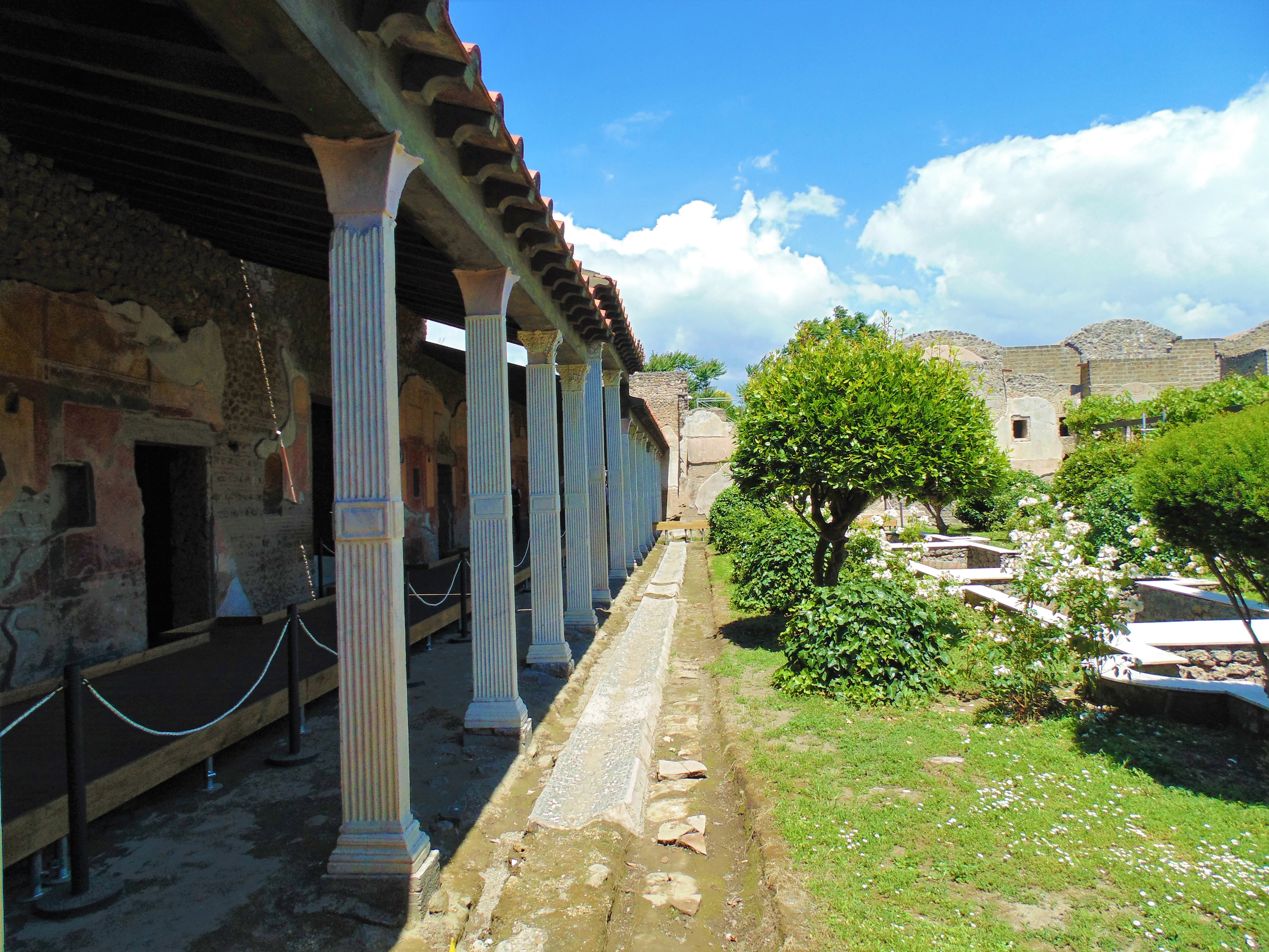
Portico and garden

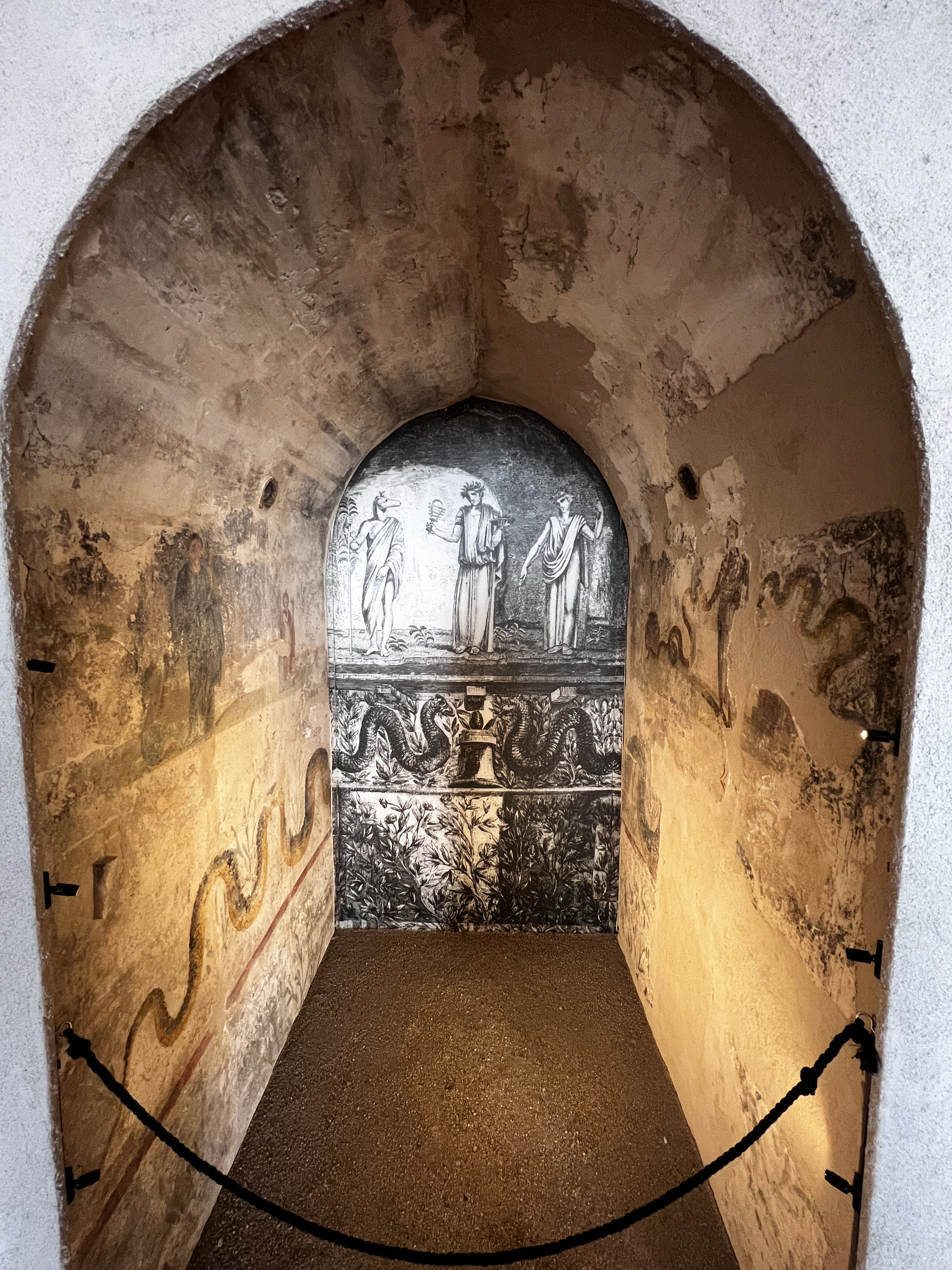
Ornate niche from the end of the garden, today in the Naples Archaeological Museum

The House of Julia Felix was a combination of indoor and outdoor areas built around atria, courtyards into which the main rooms opened, with enclosed gardens and private water supply; Sections of the praedia allowed for indoor and outdoor seating with frescoes depicting landscapes of leisure and gardens.

The quality of the decoration and architecture suggests that the praedia were intended for richer and higher status customers.

== Inside the villa ==
The walls are still almost completely covered with frescoes. The tablinum facing onto the large garden to the east had Fourth-Style frescoes consisting of dados (the lower portion of a wall, often decorated separately from the main upper scene) painted with green plants on a black background, a central zone of red and yellow panels with villas, sanctuaries and flying figures with a set of Apollo and the Muses and another with a frieze of still-life panels.

Many of the frescoes within the House of Julia Felix depicted small-time merchants and the lifestyles of every day Pompeians.

Sale of a young slave

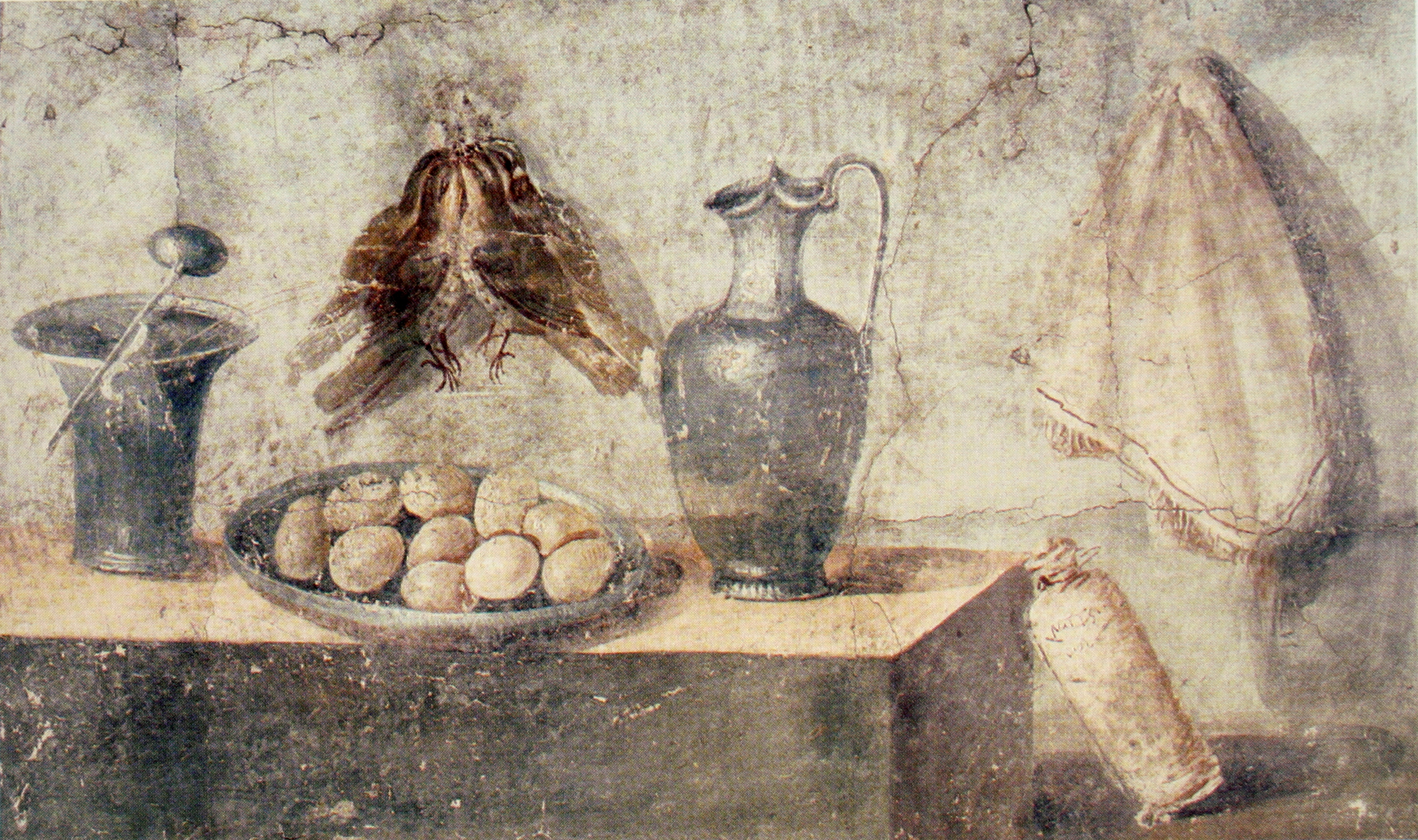
Still life with Eggs and Game, a wall painting from the House of Julia Felix

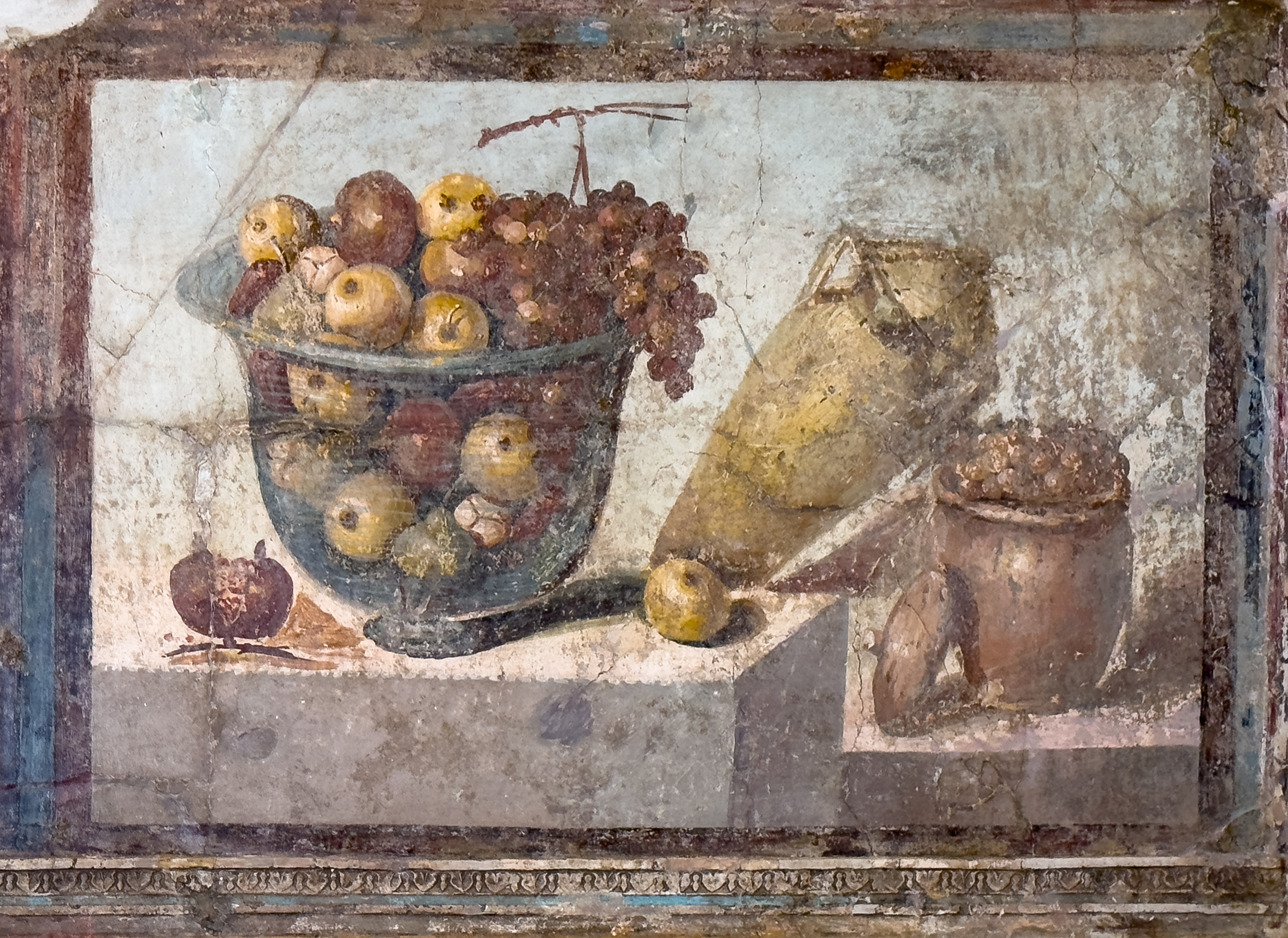
Glass bowl filled with fruit, a small amphora with garum, and an olla containing figs

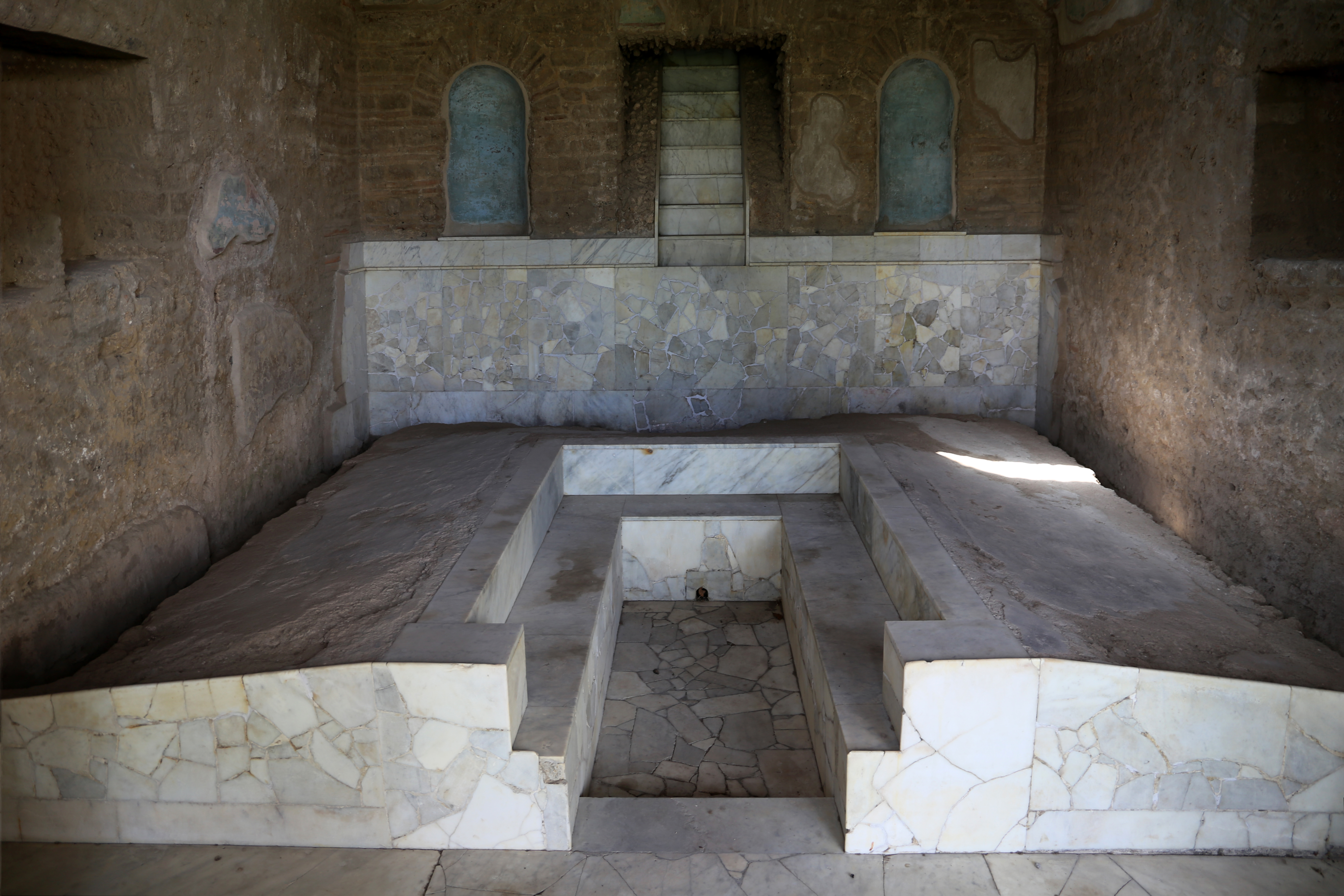
Triclinium with waterfall

The summer triclinium and baths were some of the most extravagant aspects of the house used by the tenants. The dining room was comparable to those of the wealthiest inhabitants of Pompeii who owned villas in the countryside and on the coast, and overlooked the gardens that incorporated small pools and waterfalls.

The fully equipped baths were intended for only a respectable clientele. They were in use at the time of the eruption, unlike most of the public baths in Pompeii which had been closed for repairs after the damage caused by the earthquake of AD 62.

In the large garden at the rear, fruit trees were enclosed in large squares formed by low wooden fences.

== Excavations ==
The earliest known excavation was in 1755 under the direction of R.J de Alcubierre and his assistant Karl Jakob Weber and was essentially treasure hunting, focused on recovering valuable objects and paintings for the collection of the Bourbon royal family at the Royal Palace of Portici. The first skeleton of Pompeii was found here in 1748.

The building was then reburied, but before this had happened Weber drew a plan of the building, labelling where objects or paintings had been removed, which has enabled modern scholars to reconstruct details of the decoration. Parts of the villa revealed during the first excavation were a taberna, luxurious baths, and richly decorated formal garden dining rooms.

Another excavation during 1912–1935 uncovered a shrine and the façade of the building, the side facing the Via dell'Abbondanza. Between 1998–1999 some of the most important discoveries were made; a nymphaeum or grotto of nymphs with a water-stair fountain and triclinium was a modification after the earthquake of 62 AD.
