= Charles Payne (cricketer, born 1827) =

English clergyman and cricketer

Charles Richard Payne (20 December 1827 – 31 January 1859) was an English clergyman and a cricketer who played in one first-class cricket match for Cambridge University in 1848. He was born at Hepworth, Suffolk and died at Abu Simbel, Egypt.

Payne was educated at Winchester College and Emmanuel College, Cambridge. He played cricket for the Winchester side as a middle-order batsman, and was picked for the Cambridge non-first-class trial matches in both 1847 and 1848. In the 1848 trial, he top-scored for the "Cambridge Second XI" in both innings, and this led to him being picked for a first-team match (the second team beat the first eleven convincingly, but some of this was to do with having John Wisden, not a Cambridge student, in their team, as he took 10 wickets). Payne opened the innings and scored three runs, but this proved to be his only first-class outing as he was not required to bat in the second innings.

Payne graduated from Cambridge University with a Bachelor of Arts degree in 1850. He was ordained as a Church of England priest and was curate of Stanton, Suffolk from 1855 to his death.
