= Hepworth, Suffolk =

Village in Suffolk, England

Coordinates: 52.3357°N 0.9125°E

Hepworth
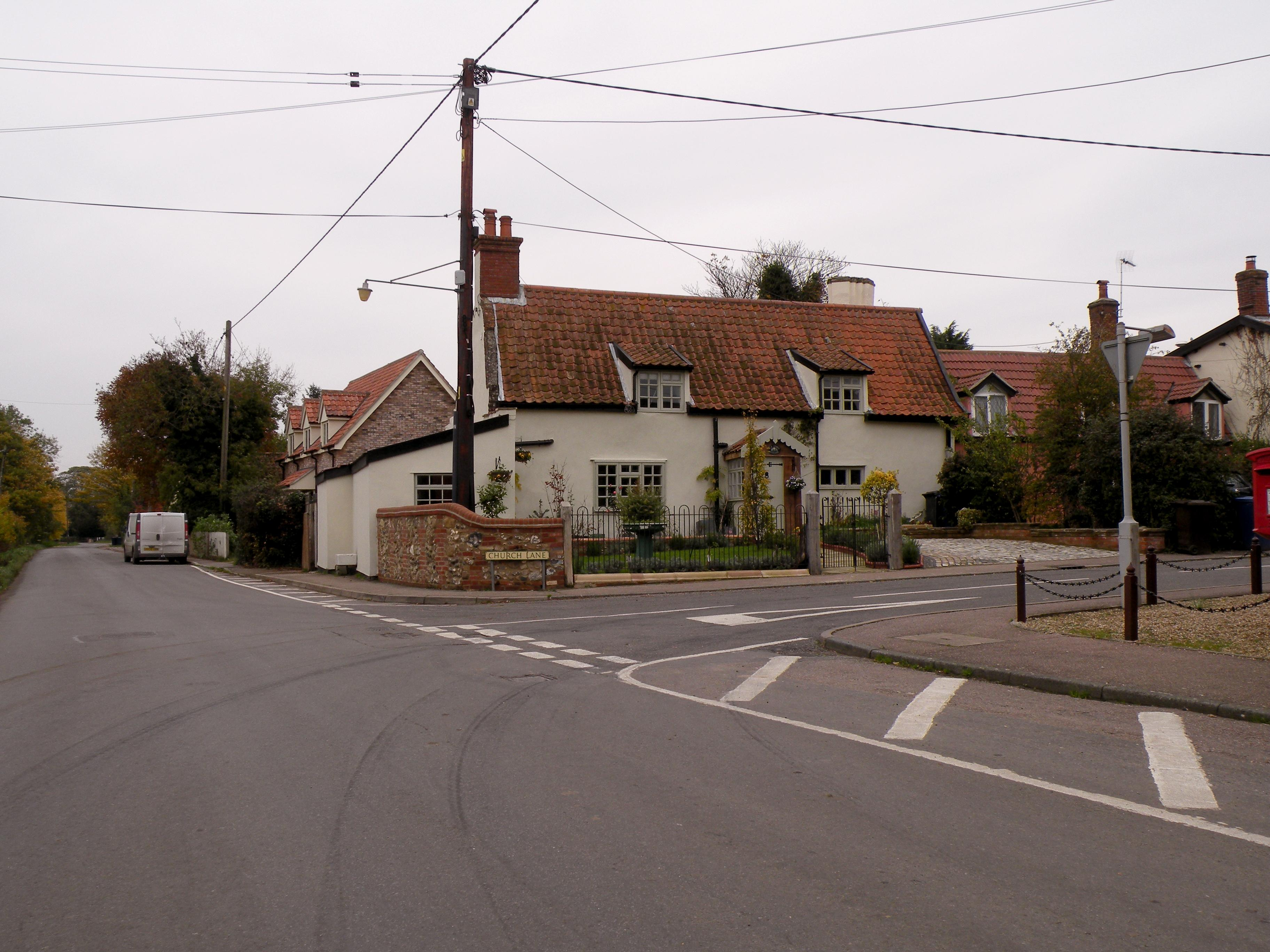
- Junction of Church Lane and The Street, Hepworth

- Location within Suffolk
- Population: 570
- OS grid reference: TL9874
- District: West Suffolk
- Shire county: Suffolk
- Region: East
- Country: England
- Sovereign state: United Kingdom
- Post town: DISS
- Postcode district: IP22
- Dialling code: 01359
- Police: Suffolk
- Fire: Suffolk
- Ambulance: East of England
- UK Parliament: West Suffolk

Hepworth is a village and civil parish in the West Suffolk district of Suffolk, England. It is situated on the Suffolk/Norfolk border and nearby settlements include the villages of Stanton, Barningham and Wattisfield. For transport there is the A143 road nearby. Hepworth has a place of worship. The population at the 2021 Census was 570.

Hepworth has two hamlets to the North and South of the village visible on Joseph Hodskinson's Map 1783, suitably named North Common, Hepworth and Hepworth Common to the South.

== History ==
Hepworth was a settlement recorded in the Domesday Book, within the hundred of Blackburn and the county of Suffolk. Recorded under the name "Hepworda" the settlement had a population in 1086 of 31.5. The Hepworda means "Heppa's enclosure or hip enclosure in Old English ".

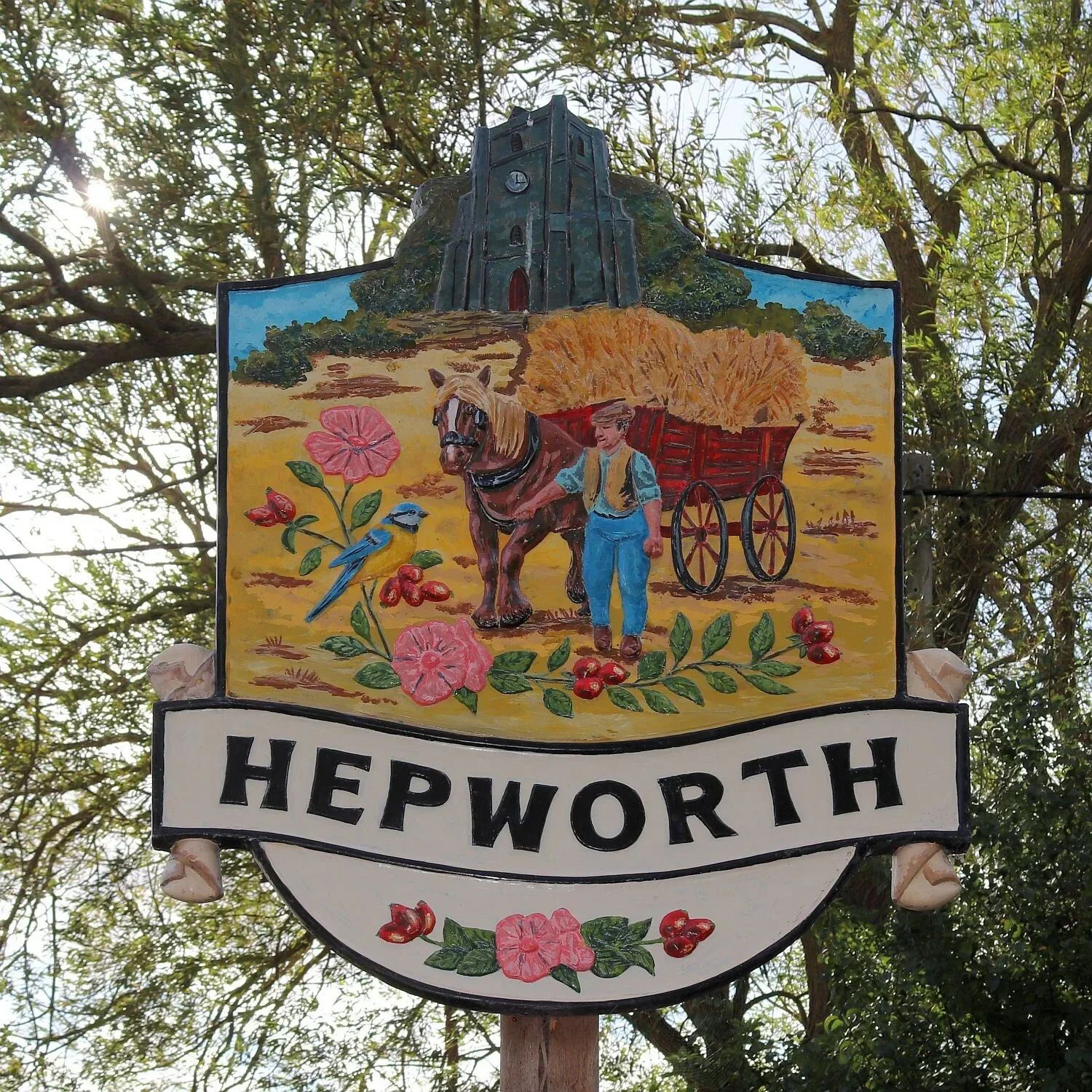
Hepworth Village Sign

Walter William Skeat within his book on The Place-Names of Suffolk, suggested the village name may be "hip-worth,' or ' farm of wild roses." The 'hip' of the fruit of the dog-rose(Rosa Canina). Note the distinct fruit of the dog-rose on the artwork of the Hepworth village sign.

The village had three public houses in the past; The Black Horse, Half Moon and also Duke of Marlborough(also traded as Marlborough Head). Each of which are no longer trading and have now since been converted to private residences.

During World War II in 1943, the RAF Shepherds Grove airfield was built on the edge of both Hepworth and Stanton to support the war effort. It was then used for storage during the Cold War, the base was shut down in 1966. The site has now partially returned to agriculture and an industrial park for local businesses under the same name, Shepherds Grove.

Part of the original Shepherds Grove site has recently had proposals to be developed into a 91 acre business site, and various large scale warehouses. This has caused a stir with the villages surrounding the area and of the even closer, Hepworth.

== St Peter's Church ==
St Peter's church dates from the 13th century. The main building material used in construction is flint and the church contains a total of 5 bells. The Tenor bell is the oldest dating from about 1470.

However following a fire in 1898 the church thatched roof burned down and had to be substantially rebuilt by John Shewell Corder. It is a grade II* listed building.

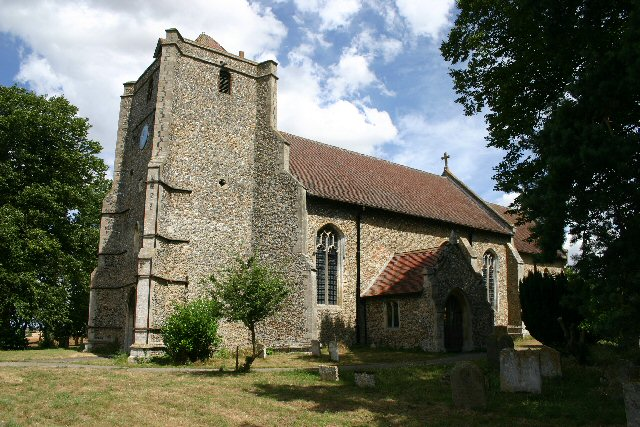
St Peter's church, Hepworth

== Notable residents ==
- Henry Hand
- John Hayter
- Charles Payne

== Amenities ==
Amenities within the village of Hepworth include the Hepworth Village Hall, which doubles as a pavilion and recreation ground. There are two separate sites for recreational camping.
