= PHerc. Paris. 4 =

Herculaneum papyrus read through means of AI

- Type: Epicurean philosophy
- Material: Carbonized papyrus
- Width: 16 cm
- Discovered: 1752–1754; Herculaneum
- Present location: Institut de France
- Language: Greek
- Culture: Roman

PHerc. Paris. 4 is a carbonized scroll of papyrus, dating to the 1st century BC to the 1st century AD. Part of a corpus known as the Herculaneum papyri, it was buried by hot-ash in the Roman city of Herculaneum during the eruption of Mount Vesuvius in 79 AD. It was subsequently discovered in excavations of the Villa of the Papyri from 1752 to 1754. Held by the Institut de France in its rolled state, it is now known to be a cornerstone example of non-invasive reading, where in February 2024, an announcement was made that the scroll's contents can be unveiled with the use of non-invasive X-ray imaging and machine learning algorithms, paving the way towards the decipherment and scanning of other Herculaneum papyri and otherwise heavily damaged scrolls.

== Background and provenance ==
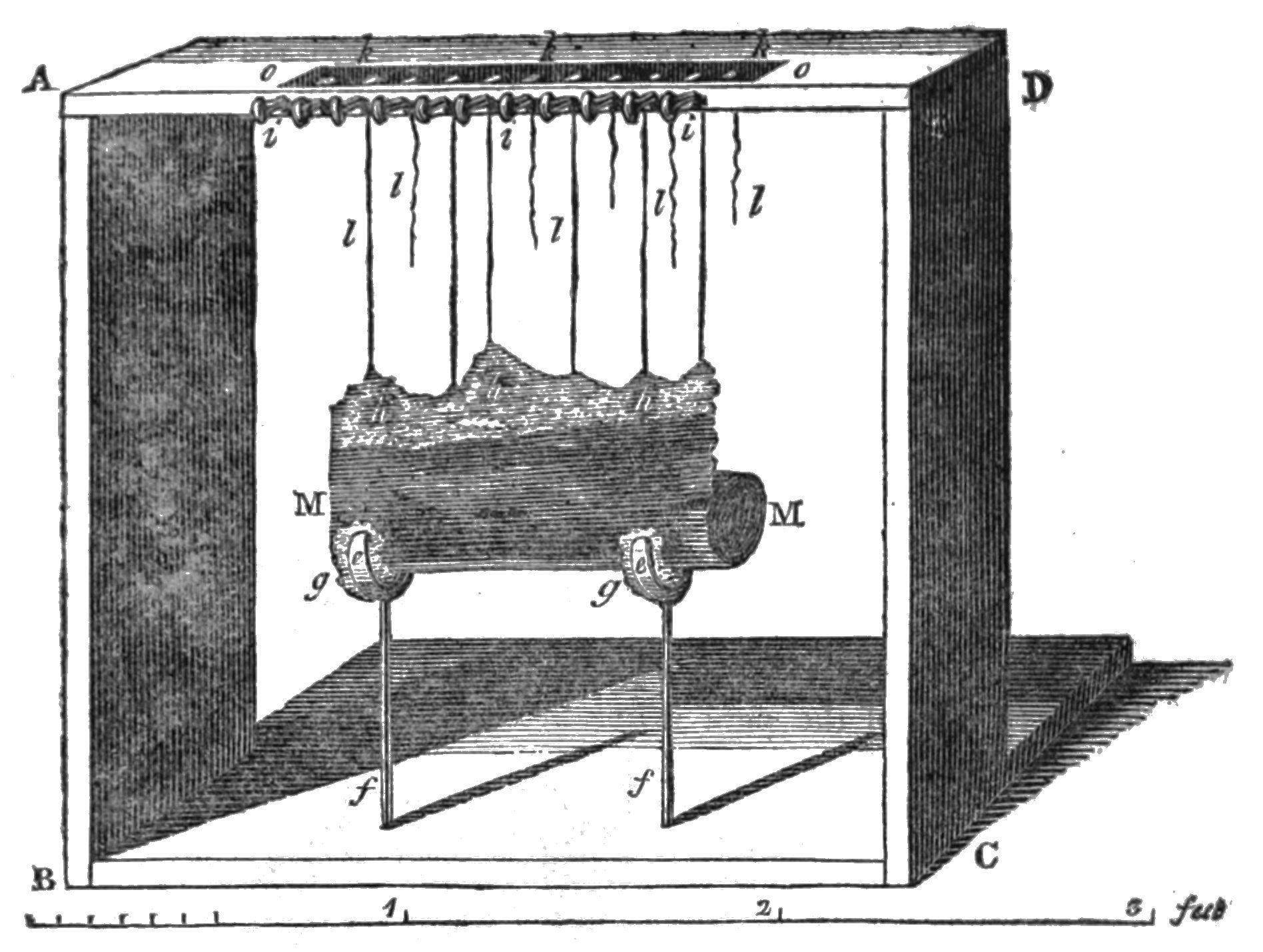
Apparatus used to unroll the Herculanean papyri (1809)

The Villa of the Papyri was buried during the eruption of Vesuvius in 79 AD, subjecting the scrolls to temperatures of 310–320 °C, compacting them and converting them to charcoal. The first scrolls were uncovered in 1752, with subsequent excavations uncovering more scrolls. There were attempts to unroll the scrolls, as the contents were realized to contain writings by classical philosophers from schools such as Epicureanism.

PHerc. Paris. 4 was amongst a set of six scrolls that entered its present-day location at the Institut de France. They were a diplomatic gift, made to commemorate peace between the Kingdom of Naples and Sicily, under the reign of Ferdinand IV and Napoleon, with the negotiations mediated by Charles Alquier.

In 1803, a tribute of vases and the scrolls arrived in France under the supervision of Francesco Carelli and was personally exhibited to Napoleon and Joséphine whereupon they entered the collection of the Institut.

Of the scrolls that entered the collection, PHerc. Paris. 3 and Paris. 4 remain intact. Paris. 1 is in fragments and bits; Paris. 2 is better preserved. Paris. 5 broke into pieces in an 1877 attempt to unpeel it, and Paris. 6 was lost when it disintegrated in an 1816 attempt.

== Unscrolling and reading ==
The 20th century yielded progress in the readings of Herculaneum texts utilizing microscopes, digital photography and multispectral filters approaching the usage infrared spectroscopy to gain better clarity of the texts.

In 2015, PHerc. Paris. 1 and PHerc. Paris. 4 were studied side by side, with Paris. 1 having a history of successful limited readings in 1986–1987, with sequences of letters such as "ΠIΠTOIE" and words such as "EIΠOI" (Greek: "would say") proving decipherable.

Utilizing a pre-filtered X-ray beam with a double Laue monochromator to convert to a mono-chromatic X-ray beam, the first letters of the unrolled scroll were identified.

After the virtual unrolling of the En-Gedi Scroll in 2015, Brent Seales, a computer scientist at the University of Kentucky, spearheaded the effort to uncover the Herculaneum corpus through non-invasive means.

On 15 March 2023, Nat Friedman, former CEO of GitHub, and Daniel Gross of Cue, upon hearing a lecture by Seales, launched the Vesuvius Challenge to utilize machine learning and new imaging techniques of the papyri using the Diamond Light Source particle accelerator to create an improved scan of the PHerc. Paris. 4, which was completed in 2019 and subsequently released to the public. The scans were completed at a resolution of 4-8 μm per voxel.

The Vesuvius Challenge raised US$1 million, with an objective of clear readings of the scroll and the future aim of reading other carbonized, sealed fragments of the Herculaneum corpus, with a distant idea towards excavating more portions of the Villa of the Papyri in order to recover more scrolls.

In October 2023, 21-year-old college student and SpaceX intern Luke Farritor and physicist Casey Handmer identified the word "porphyras" (πορΦυρας) or "purple" on the scroll utilizing neural networking to differentiate the paper and the ink; Farritor subsequently won US$40,000 for his find.

External image
- Digitally unwrapped columns of PHerc. Paris. 4

On 5 February 2024, the Grand Prize, for reading PHerc. Paris. 4, was awarded to Farritor, ETH Zurich robotics student Julian Schilliger, and Free University of Berlin Egyptian Ph.D student Youssef Nader for recovering 11 columns of text, or 2000 characters total, which is about 5% of the contents of the scroll.

The uncovered text is believed to be written by Epicurean philosopher Philodemus, and is an unrecorded text about pleasure and how it is affected by the abundance or scarcity of items, to which Philodemus disagreed writing "As too in the case of food, we do not right away believe things that are scarce to be absolutely more pleasant than those which are abundant".

The text revealed from the scroll was published in a paper for Zeitschrift für Papyrologie und Epigraphik.

=== Reactions ===
Università degli Studi di Napoli Federico II papyrology professor Federica Nicolardi praised the discovery declaring: "It's extremely exciting to be reading entire words, not just sequences of letters, from within a scroll", and expressing confidence in further future decipherment of the scroll.

Seales described of the decades of work in non-invasive decipherment that "[w]ith humility, we acknowledge the non-linear – and often unpredictable – outcomes of research, which is rarely expected, and not ever guaranteed, to lead directly to success".

In an interview with Time, Nat Friedman described the contents of the scroll as "a 2000 year old blog post, arguing with another poster", and "it's ancient Substack, and people are beefing with each other, and I think that's just amazing".

The goal of the Vesuvius Challenge for 2024 is towards deciphering 90% of the scroll's contents in addition to other fragments held by the Institut de France.
