= Marcello Gigante =

Italian academic (1923–2001)

- Born: January 20, 1923; Buccino, Salerno, Campania, Kingdom of Italy
- Died: November 23, 2001 (aged 78); Naples, Campania, Italy
- Occupations: Papyrologist; University professor
- Years active: 1945–2001
- Known for: Byzantine studies; Herculaneum papyri
- Spouse: Valeria Gigante Lanzara (m. 1960)
- Children: 4, including Claudio Gigante

Academic background
- Education: University of Naples Federico II
- Doctoral advisor: Vittorio de Falco
- Other advisor: Giovanni Pugliese Carratelli

Marcello Gigante (20 January 1923 – 23 November 2001) was an Italian Byzantinist, classical scholar, papyrologist and university professor, Emeritus at the University of Naples Federico II.

== Biography ==
Gigante was born in Buccino, near Salerno, and studied classics at the University of Naples Federico II. He graduated in 1944 defending a dissertation in Greek literature, tutored by Vittorio de Falco and Giovanni Pugliese Carratelli. His dissertation was on the Hellenica Oxyrhynchia. In 1947 he won a scholarship awarded by the Istituto Italiano per gli Studi Storici (IISS), which he had been frequenting since its foundation in 1946 by Benedetto Croce.

From 1949 to 1960 he taught Greek and Latin languages and literatures in high schools in Naples. In 1951 he was habilitated to university teaching and from 1953 he worked as appointed professor in Byzantine literature at the University of Naples. In 1956 he was awarded an annual scholarship by the Alexander von Humboldt-Stiftung and worked as researcher at the University of Bonn.

In 1958 Gigante won a national selection for university professors and in 1960 became Professor in Byzantine philology at the University of Trieste. From 1961 he also taught History of Ancient Philosophy. In 1968 he moved back to Naples and became Professor in Greek and Latin grammar at the Federico II University, moving to the chair of Greek literature in 1981. In 1969 he founded the Centro Internazionale per lo Studio dei Papiri Ercolanesi (CISPE) and in 1971 he created the chair of Herculaneum papyrology, which he held from 1971 to 1983. He retired in 1995 and was nominated Emeritus in 1998.

Gigante served as chair of the Faculty of Humanities of the University of Trieste (1966–68) and of the Institute (later Department) of Classical philology of the University of Naples for a cumulative twenty-two years. From 1982 to his death he served as the president of the Associazione Italiana di Cultura Classica. In 1983 he chaired the XVII International Congress of Papyrology (held in Naples). In 1987 he was awarded an honorary degree by the University of Athens.

=== Private life ===
Gigante has been married to Valeria Lanzara since 1960, who had previously studied under him at the Antonio Genovesi High School in Naples. She worked as a teacher of Classics in high school and published annotated translations of Hellenistic poets. They had four children, Giulia (Naples 1960), Mauro (Trieste 1962 – Naples 1969), Bruna (Naples 1970) and Claudio (Naples 1972).

== Research ==
Although Gigante worked extensively in the field of Byzantine studies — most notably on Theodore Metochites and some Italo-Greek poets — and began his academic career as a Byzantinist, his main focus was on the history of ancient philosophy (mainly Epicureanism and the poet Philodemus of Gadara) and the Herculaneum papyri. His first printed paper was on papyrological matters — a commentary on P.Ryl. III, no. 460, an anonymous historiographical work on Philip II of Macedon's Asian campaign — and he published a critical edition with commentary of the Hellenica Oxyrhynchia. Other classical texts he critically edited and/or commented are the speech Against Epicrates by Lysias and the Constitution of Athens attributed to Xenophon. His third monograph, which some consider his best work, was a detailed analysis of Pindar's fragment 169 Schröder. His research papers on Greek and Latin classical poetry were reprinted in 2006. He collaborated with the scientific journal «La Parola del Passato», founded by Pugliese Carratelli, since its first volume and officially entered the board in 1948 as secretary.

According to his tutor and friend Pugliese Carratelli, Gigante had the opportunity to study and become interested in the history of ancient philosophy while attending the weekly meetings at the IISS, which led to his full translation of the Lives of Eminent Philosophers by Diogenes Laërtius and the collected edition he promoted of the fragments of the lesser Platonic philosophers.

In the field of Byzantine studies, he published the editio princeps of an essay by Theodore Metochites on Demosthenes and Aelius Aristides, a collection of minor Italo-Greek poets, the poems of Eugenius of Palermo and the Anacreontics of Sophronius. He also studied Maximus Planudes and his translation of the Somnium Scipionis. Part of his papers pertaining to Byzantine studies were reprinted in 1981. He continued to work on Byzantine texts, and specifically on Metochites's On Education, until the early 1980s.

At the same time, he became increasingly interested in the Herculaneum papyri since he was a student, and he had the opportunity to meet a major expert in the field, Wolfgang Schmidt, when Schmidt travelled to Naples in 1953 to study P.Herc. 831 (a text by Demetrius Lacon), and again in 1956–57 in Bonn. He began systematically working on the Herculaneum papyri after his return to Naples, founding the CISPE, a specific scholarly journal («Cronache Ercolanesi», from 1971), and organizing the study and editing of the scrolls though scholarships and Master's dissertations which he personally assigned and tutored. Starting from the early 1960s, he also researched the life and works of Philodemus, the poet-philosopher best represented in the Herculaneum papyri. He edited the Glossarium Epicureum left unpublished by Hermann Usener and published two volumes (one posthumous) of his own Herculaneum papers.

In 1983 he chaired the XVII International Congress of Papyrology, which included a specific section devoted to Herculaneum papyri, and in 1993 an international congress on Epicureanism.

== Main publications ==
A list of his research papers and reviews published in «La Parola del Passato» is printed in Gigante 2002c, pp. 21–24.

=== Text editions ===
- Gigante, M., ed. (1948). Frammenti sulla Pentecontaetia. Collana di studi greci, 16. Naples: Libreria Scientifica Editrice.
- Gigante, M., ed. (1949). Le elleniche di Ossirinco. Convivium, 9. Rome: Gismondi.
- Gigante, M., ed. (1953a). La costituzione degli Ateniesi. Studi sullo Pseudo-Senofonte. Naples: Giannini.
- Gigante, M., ed. (1953b). Poeti italobizantini del secolo XIII. Collana di studi greci, 22. Naples: Libreria Scientifica Editrice. Preliminary editions and further materials:
  - Borsari, Silvano; Gigante, M. (1951a). "Poeti italo-bizantini di terra d'Otranto nel secolo XIII (I.–III.)". La Parola del Passato. 19: 287–315.
  - Gigante, M. (1951b). "Poeti bizantini di terra d'Otranto nel secolo XIII (IV.)". La Parola del Passato. 20: 367–390.
  - Gigante, M. (1954). "Poeti italobizantini di Terra d'Otranto. Altri versi di Giovanni Grasso". Ἑλληνικά. 13: 111–121.
  - Borsari, S.; Gigante, M. (1953). "Ancora sui poeti bizantini di terra d'Otranto". La Parola del Passato. 29: 140–156.
  - Gigante, M., ed. (1979). Poeti bizantini di terra d'Otranto del secolo XIII. Byzantina et Neo-hellenica Neapolitana, 7 (2nd ed.). Naples: Università di Napoli.
  - Gigante, M., ed. (1985). Poeti bizantini di terra d'Otranto del secolo XIII. Storia e cultura, 4 (reprint of 2nd ed.). Galatina: Congedo. ISBN 9788877862952.
- Sophronius (1957). Gigante, M. (ed.). Anacreontica. Rome: Gismondi.
- Gigante, M. (1958). "Ciceronis somnium Scipionis in Graecum a Maximo Planude translatum". La Parola del Passato. 59–60: 173–194.
- Lysias (1960). Gigante, M. (ed.). Contro Epicrate (2nd ed.). Naples: Loffredo.
- Diogene Laerzio (1962). Gigante, M. (ed.). Vite dei Filosofi. Rome – Bari: Laterza.
  - Diogene Laerzio (1998). Gigante, M. (ed.). Vite dei Filosofi. Vol. I–II (2nd ed.). Rome – Bari: Laterza.
- Eugenius Panormitanus (1964). Gigante, M. (ed.). Versus iambici. Testi e monumenti: Testi, 10. Palermo: Istituto Siciliano di Studi Bizantini e Neoellenici.
- Gigante, M. (1965). "Il saggio critico di Teodoro Metochites su Demostene e Aristide". La Parola del Passato. 100: 51–92.
  - Reprint with addenda: Metochite, Teodoro (1969). Gigante, M. (ed.). Saggio critico su Demostene e Aristide. Testi e documenti per lo studio dell'Antichità, 27. Milano–Varese: Istituto Editoriale Cisalpino.

=== Monographs and selected research papers ===
- Gigante, M. (1946). "Frammenti di un'epitome di φιλιππικά (P. Ryl. 490)". La Parola del Passato. 1: 127–137.
- Gigante, M. (1948). "Lo storico di Ossirinco". La Parola del Passato. 9: 228–244.
- Gigante, M. (1956). Nomos basileus. Naples: Edizioni Glaux.
  - Reprint: Gigante, M. (1993a). Nomos basileus. Naples: Bibliopolis. ISBN 9788870882827.
- Gigante, M. (1967). "Per l'interpretazione di Teodoro Metochites quale umanista bizantino". Rivista di Studi Bizantini e Neoellenici. 14: 11–25.
- Gigante, M. (1969). Ricerche filodemee. Biblioteca de «La Parola del Passato», 6. Naples: Macchiaroli.
- Gigante, M.; Jensen, Christian; Schmidt, Wolfgang (1979). Saggi di papirologia ercolanese. Naples: Morano.
- Gigante, M. (1981a). Scetticismo ed epicureismo. Naples: Bibliopolis.
- Gigante, M. (1981b). Cinismo e Epicureismo. Memorie dell'Istituto Italiano Studi Filosofici, 29. Naples: Bibliopolis. ISBN 9788870882810.
- Gigante, M. (1982). "Logos basileus. Cenni introduttivi all'inedito Protrettico di Teodoro Metochites". Jahrbuch der österreichischen Byzantinistik. 32 (4): 359–378.
- Gigante, M. (1990). Filodemo in Italia. Bibliotechina del Saggiatore ; 49. Florence: Le Monnier. ISBN 88-00-83623-2.
- Gigante, M. (1998a). Altre ricerche filodemee. Biblioteca de «La Parola del Passato», 18. Naples: Macchiaroli. ISBN 9788822209535.
- Gigante, M. (1998b). Filodemo nella storia della letteratura greca. Memorie dell'Accademia di Archeologia Lettere e Belle Arti, 11. Naples: Accademia di Archeologia Lettere e Belle Arti.
- Gigante, M. (2002a). Il libro degli epigrammi di Filodemo. Naples: Bibliopolis. (posthumous)

=== Collected papers ===
- Gigante, M. (1981c). Scritti sulla civiltà letteraria bizantina. Naples: Bibliopolis. ISBN 9788870880311.
- Gigante, M. (1993b). Ἄτακτα. Contributi alla papirologia ercolanese. Biblioteca de «La Parola del Passato», 17. Vol. I. Florence: Leo S. Olschki. ISBN 9788822209320.
- Gigante, M. (2002b). Ἄτακτα. Contributi alla papirologia ercolanese. Biblioteca de «La Parola del Passato», 19. Vol. II. Florence: Leo S. Olschki. ISBN 9788822209375. (posthumous)
- Gigante, M. (2006). Scritti sulla poesia greca e latina. Vol. I–II. Naples: Fridericiana Editrice Universitaria. ISBN 9788883380273. (posthumous)

=== Edited books ===
- Usener, Hermann (1977). Gigante, M.; Schmidt, W. (eds.). Glossarium Epicureum. Lessico Intellettuale Europeo, 14. Rome: Edizioni dell'Ateneo & Bizzarri. ISBN 9788822209740.
- Gigante, M., ed. (1984). Atti del XVII Congresso di Internazionale di Papirologia: Napoli, 17-26 maggio 1983. Vol. I–III. Naples: CISPE.
- Giannantoni, Gabriele; Gigante, M., eds. (1996). Epicureismo greco e romano: Atti del congresso internazionale: Napoli, 19-26 maggio 1993. Vol. I–III. Naples: Bibliopolis.

== Bibliography ==
=== General ===
- Capone, Alessandro (2022). "Oronzo Parlàngeli e i poeti bizantini di terra d'Otranto del XIII secolo". Lingue e Linguaggi. 51: 251–261. doi:10.1285/i22390359v51p251.
- Càssola, Filippo (2003–2004). "Ricordo di Marcello Gigante". Incontri Triestini di Filologia Classica. 3: 345–350. hdl:10077/925.
- Follieri, Enrica (1997). "La filologia bizantina in Italia nel secolo XX". In Acconcia Longo, Augusta; Perria, Lidia; Luzzi, Andrea (eds.). Byzantina et Italograeca. Studi di filologia e di paleografia. Storia e Letteratura, 195. Rome: Edizioni di Storia e Letteratura. pp. 29–30. ISBN 9788890013843.
- Gigante, M (1993c). "Marginalia Bonnensia (Bonn 1956/57)" (PDF). Eikasmos. 4: 27–32.
- Gigante, M (2002c). "Trenta anni". La Parola del Passato. 322: 10–24.
- Leone, Giuliana (2007). "Wolfgang Schmid (1913-1980)". In Capasso, Mario (ed.). Hermae. Scholars and Scholarship in Papyrology. Biblioteca degli «Studi di Egittologia e di Papirologia», 7. Vol. II. Pisa – Rome: Fabrizio Serra. pp. 63–80. ISBN 9788862273374.
- Longo Auricchio, Francesca (2018). "Marcello GIGANTE". Dizionario Biografico degli Italiani.
- Parlàngeli, Oronzo (1953a). "Sulla scuola poetica greco-salentina del XIII secolo". La Parola del Passato. 29: 132–139.
- Parlàngeli, O. (1953b). "Review of Gigante 1953b". Paideia. 10 (2–3): 133–137.
- Parlàngeli, Addolorata; Parlàngeli, O. (1951). "La scuola poetica greco-salentina del XIII secolo". Atti dell'VIII congresso di studi bizantini (Palermo, 3–10 aprile 1951). Studi Bizantini e Neoellenici, 7. Vol. I. Rome: Associazione Nazionale per gli Studi Bizantini. pp. 160–176.
- Pugliese Carratelli, G. (2002). "Ricordo di Marcello Gigante". La Parola del Passato. 322: 5–9.
- Roberts, C. H., ed. (1938). "460. Fragment of a Testimony Book". Catalogue of the Greek and Latin Papyri in the John Rylands Library—Manchester. P.Ryl. Vol. III. Theological and Literary Texts (nn. 457–551). Manchester: University Press. pp. 10–13.
- Tessier, Andrea (2003–2004). "Ricordo di Marcello Gigante bizantinista". Incontri Triestini di Filologia Classica. 3: 351–356. hdl:10077/926.
- Wilson, Nigel G. (1990). Filologi bizantini. Collana di Filologia Classica, 5. Translated by Gigante, Giulia. Foreword by M. Gigante. Naples: Morano.

=== Translations by V. Gigante Lanzara ===
- Arato (2018). Gigante Lanzara, V. (ed.). Fenomeni. Milan: Garzanti. ISBN 9788811811664.
- Callimaco (1984). Gigante Lanzara, V. (ed.). Inni, Chioma di Berenice. Milan: Garzanti.
- Licofrone (2000). Gigante Lanzara, V. (ed.). Alessandra. Milan: BUR. ISBN 8817173320.
- Nicandro (2022). Gigante Lanzara, V. (ed.). Theriaka – Alexipharmaka. Biblioteca dell'«Archivum Romanicum» • Serie I: Storia, Letteratura, Paleografia, 524. Florence: Leo S. Olschki. ISBN 9788822268242.
- Posidippo (2009). Gigante Lanzara, V. (ed.). Epigrammi. Naples: Bibliopolis. ISBN 9788870885835.
- Teocrito (1992). Gigante Lanzara, V. (ed.). Idilli. Milan: Garzanti. ISBN 9788811811428.
