= Henry Hand =

English cricketer

Henry George Hand (17 September 1810 – 12 August 1887) was an English cricketer with amateur status. He was associated with Cambridge University and made his debut in 1828.

Hand was educated at Eton College and King's College, Cambridge. He was a fellow of King's 1831–51 including a period as vice-provost (deputy head of the college). During this time he was ordained as a Church of England priest; he was rector of Hepworth, Suffolk, 1851–83.

== Bibliography ==
- Haygarth, Arthur (1996) [1862]. Scores & Biographies, Volume 1 (1744–1826). Kennington: Frederick Lillywhite. ISBN 978-19-00592-23-9.
- Haygarth, Arthur (1997) [1862]. Scores & Biographies, Volume 2 (1827–1840). Kennington: Frederick Lillywhite. ISBN 978-19-00592-23-9.
