= St John the Baptist's Church, Stanton =

Coordinates: 52.3268°N 0.8779°E

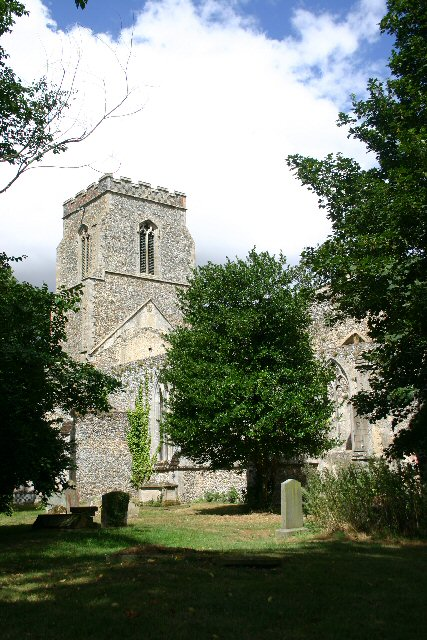
- St John the Baptist's Church, Stanton, from the southeast

- Location in Suffolk
- OS grid reference: TL 962 738
- Location: Stanton, Suffolk
- Country: England
- Denomination: Anglican
- Website: Churches Conservation Trust

Architecture
- Functional status: Redundant
- Heritage designation: Grade II*
- Designated: 14 July 1955
- Architectural type: Church
- Style: Gothic
- Groundbreaking: 13th century

Specifications
- Materials: Flint with some brick and freestone dressings

St John the Baptist's Church is a redundant Anglican church in the village of Stanton, Suffolk, England. It is recorded in the National Heritage List for England as a designated Grade II* listed building, and is under the care of the Churches Conservation Trust. Only the tower is intact, the body of the church being roofless. The remains of the church stand to the west of the village.

== History ==
The church dates from the 14th century, with additions and alterations during the following century. It was restored in 1616. Its parish was united with the adjacent parish of All Saints in 1756, and St John's became derelict and roofless. The church was repaired in the 1980s, raising the walls of the nave and chancel to their full height.

== Architecture ==
St John's is constructed in flint and some red brick, with freestone dressings. Parts of the walls are rendered. Its plan consists of a three-bay nave, a chancel, a south porch and a west tower. The tower is in four stages. Its west wall is built against the boundary of the churchyard and the lowest stage is open, providing a way for processions around the church. There are diagonal buttresses at the west end, and a stair turret at the southeast angle. In the top stage are two-light bell openings. The parapet is battlemented, and decorated with chequerwork. The nave has 13th-century doorways and two two-light windows in both north and south walls. The porch dates from the 14th century. It was originally gabled, and has a blocked niche above its doorway. The chancel has a two-light window in each of the north, south and east walls.

== See also ==
- List of churches preserved by the Churches Conservation Trust in the East of England
