= Eugenius of Palermo =

Eugenius of Palermo (also Eugene) (Latin: Eugenius Siculus or Eugenius Panormitanus, Greek: Εὐγενἠς Εὐγένιος ὁ τῆς Πανόρμου, Italian: Eugenio da Palermo; c. 1130 – 1202) was an amiratus (admiral) of the Kingdom of Sicily in the late twelfth century.

He was of Greek origin, but born in Palermo, and had an educated background, for he was "most learned in Greek and Arabic, and not unskilled in Latin." By the time of his admiralcy, the educated, multilingual Greek or Arab administrator was becoming rare in Sicily.

Eugenius' family had been important in the Hauteville administration for generations before him. He was a son of Admiral John and grandson of another Admiral Eugenius. He served under William II before being raised to the rank of admiral in 1190. His first duties were as an officer of the diwan (Latinised duana or dohana). He bore the title magister duane baronum in September 1174, when he was sent by the king to Salerno to check the accounts of the bailiffs and to authorise the sale of property on behalf of the stratigotus, so he could pay off a loan. Though his official duties as magister are unknown, he was also in charge of publishing and disseminating a signaculum of William's whereby all tolls at bridges, roadways, and riverways in the royal demesne were lifted (April 1187). Eugenius determined the boundaries of the lands of the church of Santa Sofia of Benevento in 1175 and he arbitrated a boundary dispute between Ravello and Amalfi at Nocera in 1178 and at Minori later that year in September. There he was styled magister regie dohane baronum et de secretis. At this time, he appears to have worked under Walter de Moac.

He loyally served Tancred before transitioning to a role in the Hohenstaufen government of Constance and the Emperor Henry VI. He was falsely accused of conspiring against Henry and was briefly held captive in Germany.

Eugenius was an accomplished translator and poet and has even been suggested as the person behind the pen name "Hugo Falcandus", a chronicler who wrote a record of events at Palermo from 1154 to 1169. Eugenius was certainly well-placed for such a chronicle. Around 1154, he made a translation from Arabic to Latin of Ptolemy's Optics, which survives in twenty manuscripts. He also translated the Sibylline Erythraeon from Greek into Latin, but the only manuscripts of this which survive are thirteenth-century copies based on the prophecies of Joachim of Fiore. He wrote Greek poetry, of which twenty-four verses survive in a fourteenth-century manuscript. They were of mediocre quality and written in the style then prevalent at Constantinople. The poems give insight to his life and times: he was an intimate of King William I and an associate of the Greek religious communities in Brindisi and Messina. He wrote one poem lamenting his imprisonment (in Germany), blaming it on the evil state of the world, but taking a philosophical approach to his troubles.

== See also ==
- Latin translations of the 12th century

== Sources ==
- Norwich, John Julius. The Kingdom in the Sun 1130–1194. London: Longmans, 1970.
- Matthew, Donald. The Norman Kingdom of Sicily (Cambridge Medieval Textbooks). Cambridge University Press, 1992.
- Houben, Hubert (translated by Graham A. Loud and Diane Milburn). Roger II of Sicily: Ruler between East and West. Cambridge University Press, 2002.
- von Falkenhausen, Vera. "Eugenio da Palermo." Dizionario Biografico degli Italiani. 1993.
- Jamison, Evelyn. Admiral Eugenius of Sicily, his Life and Work and the Authorship of the Epistola ad Petrum and the Historia Hugonis Falcandi Siculi. London: 1957.
- Gigante, Marcello. Eugenii Panormitani versus iambici (Istituto Siciliano di studi bizantini e neoellenici. Testi e monumenti 10). Palermo: Bruno Lavagnini, 1964.
