= Stanton Woods =

Woods in Suffolk, England

Coordinates: 52.31°N 0.88°E

- Site of Special Scientific Interest
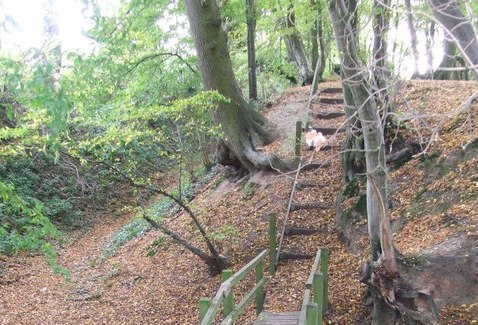
- Steps in the Grundle
- Location of Stanton Woods.
- Area of search: Suffolk
- Grid reference: TL 962 719
- Interest: Biological
- Area: 66.1 hectares
- Notification date: 1984
- Location map: Magic Map

Stanton Woods is a 66.1-hectare (163-acre) biological Site of Special Scientific Interest south of Stanton in Suffolk.

The site consists of several ancient coppice with standards woods, some of which are on boulder clay and others on drier, acid soil. There are also mown rides and small clearings. The Grundle is a linear wooded gorge.

Some areas are closed to the public, but others have roads and footpaths running through them.
