= John Hayter (antiquary) =

John Hayter (1756–1818) was an English churchman and academic, known as an antiquary.

== Life ==
He was educated at Eton College and at King's College, Cambridge, of which he became a fellow. He gained the Browne gold medal for a Greek ode in 1776, and graduated B.A. 1778, M.A. 1788, M.A. Oxford, ad eundem, 19 February 1812. Hayter was presented by his college to the rectory of Hepworth, Suffolk in Suffolk, and was chaplain in ordinary to the Prince of Wales.

In 1800 the Prince of Wales undertook to continue the unrolling and deciphering of the papyri found at Herculaneum in 1752. Hayter was put on a salary and sent to Naples, to take charge of the "Officina" and direct the work; the papyri had been moved to Palermo. Hayter began operations in 1802 at Portici, near Naples. He had charge of the papyri from 1802 to 1806.

In four years about two hundred rolls were opened, and nearly one hundred copied in lead-pencil facsimiles under Hayter's superintendence. On the French invasion of Naples in 1806 Hayter moved to Palermo; the original papyri fell into the hands of the French. The lead-pencil facsimiles also passed out of Hayter's hands, but were recovered from the Neapolitan authorities through the influence of William Drummond of Logiealmond, the British minister. At Palermo Hayter superintended the engraving of the Carmen Latinum and the Περὶ Θανάτου.

In 1809 Hayter was recalled to England by the Prince of Wales. He died at Paris from apoplexy on 29 November 1818, in his sixty-third year.

== Works ==
Hayter's lead-pencil facsimiles and the engravings made at Palermo were presented by the prince in 1810 to the university of Oxford. The appendix to Walter Scott's Fragmenta Herculanensia contains reproductions of copper-plates engraved from Hayter's lead-pencil facsimiles.

Hayter published:

- The Herculanean and Pompeian Manuscripts [London?], 1800.
- The Herculanean Manuscripts, 2nd edit. London, 1810.
- Observations upon a Review of the "Herculanensia" in the "Quarterly Review", London, 1810. These three works were published as "Letters" to the Prince of Wales.
- A Report upon the Herculanean Manuscripts, London, 1811.

Scott thought that Hayter's restorations of the text were of little value.

== Notes ==
Attribution

This article incorporates text from a publication now in the public domain: Stephen, Leslie; Lee, Sidney, eds. (1891). "Hayter, John". Dictionary of National Biography. Vol. 25. London: Smith, Elder & Co.
