= Philodemus =

1st-century BC Greek Epicurean philosopher and poet

- Born: c. 110 BC; Gadara, Coele-Syria
- Died: c. 40 or 35 BC; Herculaneum

Philosophical work
- Era: Hellenistic philosophy
- Region: Western philosophy
- School: Epicureanism
- Main interests: Atomism, ethics, history, poetry, rhetoric

Philodemus of Gadara (Ancient Greek: Φιλόδημος ὁ Γαδαρεύς, Philodēmos, "love of the people"; c. 110 – prob. c. 40 or 35 BC) was an Epicurean philosopher and poet. He studied under Zeno of Sidon in Athens, before moving to Rome, and then to Herculaneum. He was once known chiefly for his poetry preserved in the Greek Anthology, but since the 18th century, many writings of his have been discovered among the charred papyrus rolls at the Villa of the Papyri at Herculaneum. The task of excavating and deciphering these rolls is difficult, and work continues to this day. The works of Philodemus so far discovered include writings on ethics, theology, rhetoric, music, poetry, and the history of various philosophical schools. Ethel Ross Barker suggested in 1908 that he was owner of the Villa of the Papyri Library, although it is far more likely that the owner was in fact his wealthy Roman patron Lucius Calpurnius Piso Caesoninus.

== Life ==
Philodemus was born c. 110 BC, in Gadara, Coele-Syria (in present-day Jordan). He studied under the Epicurean philosopher, Zeno of Sidon, the head (scholarch) of the Epicurean school, in Athens, before settling in Rome about 80 BC. He was a follower of Zeno, but an innovative thinker in the area of aesthetics, in which conservative Epicureans had little to contribute. He was a friend of Lucius Calpurnius Piso Caesoninus, and was implicated in Piso's profligacy by Cicero, who, however, praises Philodemus warmly for his philosophic views and for the elegans lascivia of his poems. Philodemus was an influence on Horace's Ars Poetica. The Greek anthology contains thirty-four of his epigrams, most of them love poems.

== The Villa of the Papyri ==
There was an extensive library at the Villa of the Papyri at Herculaneum, a significant part of which was formed by a library of Epicurean texts, some of which were present in more than one copy, suggesting the possibility that this section of the library was Philodemus' own. The contents of the villa were buried in the eruption of Vesuvius, 79 CE, and the papyri were carbonized into black rolls but preserved.

During the 18th-century exploration of the Villa by tunnelling, from 1752 to 1754 there were recovered some 1800 full and partial carbonized papyrus rolls containing thirty-six treatises attributed to Philodemus. These works deal with music, rhetoric, ethics, signs, virtues and vices, the good king, and defend the Epicurean standpoint against the Stoics and the Peripatetics. The first fragments of Philodemus from Herculaneum were published in 1824. In 2019, a scroll on the history of Plato's Academy, which had been unrolled and glued to cardboard in 1795, was analyzed using shortwave-infrared hyperspectral imaging. This not only revealed what was written on the back of the scroll, but also illuminated 150 new words on the front. In 2025, the title of another carbonized scroll, also scanned using non-invasive technology, was identified as Philodemus' On Vices with the aid of machine learning techniques.

"The difficulties involved in unrolling, reading, and interpreting these texts were formidable. Naples was not a particularly hospitable destination for classical scholars. Finally, the philosophies of the Hellenistic schools were neither well-known nor highly regarded until quite recently. These factors combined to cripple scholarly interest in and use of the Herculaneum papyri. Recently, however, in part due to the efforts of the International Center for the Study of the Herculaneum Papyri, these rolls have been the object of renewed scholarly work and have yielded many findings indispensable for the study of Hellenistic philosophy." Today researchers work from digitally enhanced photographs, infra-red and multiple-imaging photography, and 18th-century transcriptions of the documents, which were being destroyed as they were being unrolled and transcribed. The actual papyri are in the National Library, Naples.

Named for the philosopher-poet, the Philodemus Project is an international effort, supported by a major grant from the National Endowment for the Humanities and by contributions of individuals and participating universities, to reconstruct new texts of Philodemus' works on Poetics, Rhetoric, and Music. These texts will be edited and translated and published in a series of volumes by Oxford University Press.

Philodemus: On Poems. I, edited with Introduction, Translation, and Commentary by Richard Janko, appeared in 2001 and won the Charles J. Goodwin Award of Merit. "Philodemus’ On Poems, in particular, opens a window onto a lost age of scholarship—the period between Aristotle's Poetics and Horace's Art of Poetry, the works which define classicism for the ancient and modern worlds", Janko has written.

The Project's next volumes are scheduled to be:

- On Poems V, edited and translated by David Armstrong, James Porter, Jeffrey Fish, and Cecilia Mangoni
- On Rhetoric I-II, edited and translated by David Blank
- On Rhetoric III, edited and translated by Dirk Obbink and Juergen Hammerstaedt.

== Inductive reasoning ==
In On Methods of Inference, Philodemus comments on the problem of induction, doubting the reliability of inductive reasoning from the observed to the unobserved. One problem is the existence of unique events that could never be guessed from what happens elsewhere. "There are also in our experience some infrequent occurrences, as for example the man in Alexandria half a cubit high, with a colossal head that could be beaten with a hammer, who used to be exhibited by the embalmers; the person in Epidaurus who was married as a young woman and then become a man." Induction is also unreliable if it extrapolates far beyond our experience: "We shall not, therefore, use the [inference] that since the men among us are mortal the men in Libya would also be mortal, much less the inference that since the living beings among us are mortal, if there are any living beings in Britain, they would be mortal." The fourth book of Philodemus' On Death (PHerc. 1050) is an important text that sheds light on various aspects of the well-known Epicurean claim that "death is nothing to us".

== List of Philodemus' works ==
This is a list of the major works of Philodemus found so far at Herculaneum.

=== Historical works ===
- Index Stoicorum (PHerc. 1018)
- Index Academicorum (PHerc. 164, 1021)
- On the Stoics (PHerc. 155, 339)
- On Epicurus (PHerc. 1232, 1289)
- Works on the Records of Epicurus and some others (PHerc. 1418, 310)
- To Friends of the School (PHerc. 1005)

=== Scientific works ===
- On Phenomena and Inferences (PHerc. 1065)

=== Theological writings ===
- On Piety (P.Herc. 229, 242, 243, 247, 248, 433, 437, 1077, 1088, 1098, 1114, 1428, 1609, 1610, 1648, 1788)
- On Gods (PHerc. 26 (Book 1), PHerc. 139 (Book 8))
- On the Way of Life of the Gods (PHerc. 152, 157)

=== Ethics ===
- On Vices and Virtues, book 7 (On Flattery) (PHerc. 222, 223, 1082, 1089, 1457, 1675)
- On Vices and Virtues, book 9 (On Household Management) (PHerc. 1424)
- On Vices and Virtues, book 10 (On Arrogance) (PHerc. 1008)
- Comparetti Ethics (named after its first editor; PHerc. 1251)
- On Death (PHerc. 1050)
- On Frank Criticism (PHerc. 1471)
- On Anger (PHerc. 182)

=== On rhetoric, music, and poetry ===
- On Rhetoric (on many papyri)
- On Music (PHerc. 1497)
- On Poems (on many papyri)
- On the Good King according to Homer (PHerc. 1507)

=== Unpublished works ===
- PHerc. Paris. 4
- On Vices and Virtues, book 1 (PHerc. 172)

=== Editions ===
- Fleischer, Kilian Josef (2023). Philodem, Geschichte der Akademie: Einführung, Ausgabe, Kommentar. Leiden; Boston: Brill. ISBN 9789004546530.

=== English translations ===
- Philodemus: On Anger. (2020), David Armstrong & Michael McOsker. SBL. ISBN 1628372699
- Philodemus: On Death. (2009), W. Benjamin Henry. SBL. ISBN 1-58983-446-1
- Philodemus: On Frank Criticism. (1998), David Konstan, Diskin Clay, Clarence, E. Glad. SBL. ISBN 1-58983-292-2
- Philodemus: On Methods of Inference. 2nd edition. (1978). Phillip Howard De Lacy, Estelle Allen De Lacy. Bibliopolis.
- Philodemus, On Piety, Part 1. (1996). Critical Text with Commentary by Dirk Obbink. Oxford University Press. ISBN 0-19-815008-3
- Philodemus, On Poems, Book 1. (2001). Edited with Introduction, Translation, and Commentary by Richard Janko. Oxford University Press. ISBN 0-19-815041-5
- Philodemus, On Poems, Book 2, with the fragments of Heracleodorus and Pausimachus. (2020). Edited with Introduction, Translation, and Commentary by Richard Janko. Oxford University Press. ISBN 9780198835080
- Philodemus, On Poems, Books 3-4, with the Fragments of Aristotle, On Poets. (2010). Edited with Introduction, Translation, and Commentary by Richard Janko. Oxford University Press. ISBN 0-19-957207-0
- Philodemus, On Property Management. (2013), Voula Tsouna. SBL. ISBN 1-58983-667-7
- Philodemus, On Rhetoric Books 1 and 2: Translation and Exegetical Essays. (2005). Clive Chandler (editor). Routledge. ISBN 0-415-97611-1
- David Sider, (1997), The Epigrams of Philodemos. Introduction, Text, and Commentary. Oxford University Press. ISBN 0-19-509982-6
