= Stanton, Suffolk =

Village in Suffolk, England

Coordinates: 52.324°N 0.885°E

Stanton
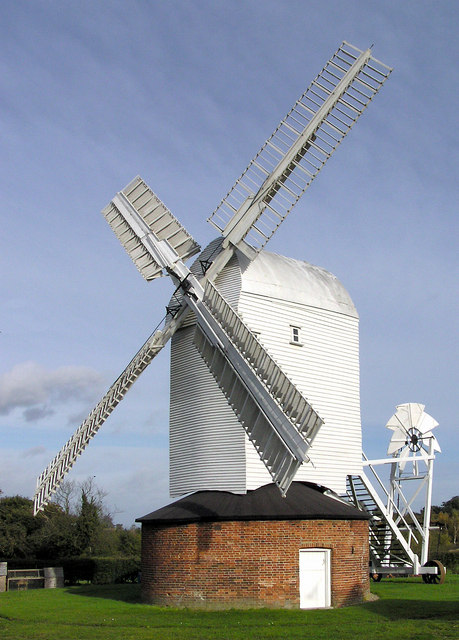
- Upthorpe Mill

- Location within Suffolk
- Population: 2,507 (2011 census)
- OS grid reference: TL967734
- District: West Suffolk
- Shire county: Suffolk
- Region: East
- Country: England
- Sovereign state: United Kingdom
- Post town: BURY ST. EDMUNDS
- Postcode district: IP31
- Dialling code: 01359
- Police: Suffolk
- Fire: Suffolk
- Ambulance: East of England

Stanton is a village and civil parish in the West Suffolk district of Suffolk in eastern England, about nine miles north-east of Bury St Edmunds, on the A143 road to Diss. Close to the village lies the former WWII airfield RAF Shepherds Grove, where American forces were based. One of the main landmarks in the village is the fine restored windmill at Upthorpe Farm, to the east of the village. The name "Stanton" means 'a homestead on stony ground'.

== History ==
It's believed the site of the village has been continuously occupied since Roman times.

Stanton dates back to Roman times, sited at the junction of Peddars Way and the Roman road believed to run between Camulodunum (Colchester) and Bildeston. The site of a Roman Villa known as 'Stanton Chare' is at the junction of the two ancient routes.

The Manor of Stanton was held for many years by Abbots of Bury St Edmunds, and subsequently by the Capell Lofft family.

The present parish was formed from two earlier parishes, Stanton All Saints and Stanton St John. The former St John's Church, on a prominent hill outside the village, was abandoned and services continued at All Saints in the village centre.

== Upthorpe Mill ==
Upthorpe Mill was built in 1751 at a site on the other side of the village to where it is today. It was moved to its present site in 1808 and worked until the First World War. Repairs carried out in 1939 returned it to working order and the mill was restored in 1990.

== Schools ==
There is a Primary school, Stanton Pre-School and a nursery. The primary school predominantly feeds through to either Ixworth free school or Thurston Community College.

== Miscellaneous ==
The eleven member Parish Council meets on the second Thursday of every month in the Terry Bray room of the village hall.

The one local pub is 'The Cock Inn'.

There are two open churches, All Saints (Church of England), and a Methodist church. The disused church of St John’s holds occasional services. All Saints and St John’s are part of the United Benefice of Stanton, Hopton, Market Weston, Barningham & Coney Weston.

There are number of businesses in the village; a post office and newsagents, a fish and chips shop, hairdressers and Palmers Bakery.

Stanton has a football team Stanton F.C..

Henry Wadlow ran a racehorse training establishment in the village, preparing Bourton to win the 1854 Grand National

In 2010, the 1st Stanton Brownies moved to Ixworth and became the 1st Ixworth Brownies.

Stanton Woods is a biological Site of Special Scientific Interest south of the village.
