= Roque Joaquín de Alcubierre =

Spanish archaeologist (1702-1780)

Roque Joaquín de Alcubierre (16 August 1702 – 14 March 1780) was a military engineer in the Spanish Army who discovered architectural remains at Pompeii and Herculaneum.

== Early life ==
Alcubierre was born and studied in Zaragoza, Spain. When he reached the requisite age, he decided to volunteer in the army as an engineer, after receiving help from the influential Count of Bureta. His work led him to various Spanish cities including Girona (where he helped build military fortifications), Barcelona and Madrid. In 1738 he was promoted to the rank of Captain and was sent to Italy. By 1750 he was a Lieutenant-Colonel and in 1777 he reached the summit of his military career with the post of Field Marshal.

== Herculaneum and Pompeii ==
In the course of his works prospecting the estate of the future Charles III of Spain he stumbled across some remains of the Roman city of Herculaneum. He then sought permission and funding from the king to continue the excavations on a larger scale, which was granted in 1738 although with little manpower and resources. With many difficulties, he finally discovered the city's theatre and following this, various murals. After these two key discoveries, he managed to excavate the rest of the city without large obstructions.

In 1748, he began prospecting the nearby ancient city of Pompeii (which had previously been believed to be Stabiae), noted for the fact that it remained virtually unchanged, with expressions of surprise still on the inhabitants who remained there intact, buried by the sudden eruption of Vesuvius. This discovery radically changed the concept of archaeology, which until then had only been interested in finding interesting artefacts to decorate the cabinets of private collectors and estates.

== Later life ==
He went on to excavate the towns of Asinio Pollio (Sorrento), Capri, Pozzuoli and Cumae. However, from 1750 onwards, arguments arose between him and his subordinates, until he abandoned his responsibilities as head of the excavations and left his duties to people such as Winckelmann, Karl Jakob Weber and Francisco la Vega. They charged him with mishandling of the ancient artifacts.

Alcubierre died on 14 March 1780 in Naples, Italy.
