= Karl Jakob Weber =

18th-century Swiss architect and engineer

Karl Jakob Weber (1 August 1712 – 15 February 1764) was a Swiss archeologist, military engineer and mercenary who worked under the orders of the Spanish military engineer Roque de Alcubierre in the excavations of Herculaneum, Pompeii and Stabiae, under the patronage of King Charles VII of Naples. At first a soldier and military engineer, he joined the excavations in 1749. Weber's detailed drawings provided some of the basis for the luxurious royal folios of Le Antichità di Ercolano esposte, by means of which the European intelligentsia became aware of the details of what was being recovered. He is considered a pioneer of modern archeology.

== Biography ==
Karl Jakob Weber's signature when he was serving under the orders of Charles VII of Naples. The text reads: D(on) Carlos Weber

Weber was born in Arth, in the Swiss canton of Schwyz, the son of Anna Flora Zay and Beat Jakob Weber, a member of the Council of Schwyz. He attended the Jesuit college of Lucerne from 1729 to 1731, then travelled to Pavia, Lombardy, to study mathematics at the Ghislieri College from 1731 to 1735. Weber enlisted in the Tschudi Regiment, a unit of Swiss mercenaries in the service of the Kingdom of Naples. The remainder of his career was passed in Italy. After a few years, he took examinations for admission to the corps of military engineers, and was accepted in the Royal Guard as a military engineer in 1743.

Weber's unwilling collaborator was Roque de Alcubierre, the Spanish military engineer previously in charge of the excavations, whose treasure-hunting technique provided the fine bronzes and other works of art that kept royal patronage stimulated. Alcubierre was jealous of Weber, whose system of excavating whole rooms with a concern for context makes him a heroic forerunner of today's archeological profession, and attempted to sabotage Weber's work. Weber joined the forces excavating Herculaneum in late 1749, initially at the request of Alcubierre. In addition to the Villa dei Papiri he recovered much of the Theatre at Herculaneum, the Praedia of Julia Felix on the Via dell'Abbondanza at Pompeii, for which he drew up an axonometric plan, and several villas at Stabiae, bringing the first professionalism to the Royal digs. Weber died in Naples on 15 February 1764, aged 51.

On Weber's death, the architect Francisco La Vega was put in charge of excavations. Weber's plan of the still-buried Villa of the Papyri at Herculaneum, which was being explored room by room by smashing openings through frescoed walls, is still the basis of our understanding of its layout, which was echoed in the construction of the J. Paul Getty Museum, Malibu, California.
