= Francesco Carelli =

Francesco Carelli (8 October 1758 in Conversano – 17 September 1832 in Naples) was an administrative officer of the Kingdom of Naples and an important numismatist, coin collector and antiquarian. He had a special interest in ancient coins and himself had an important collection of ancient Greek coins. In an extensive work, Numorum Italiae veteris Tabulae CCII (published posthumously in 1850) he put together all the known ancient coins of Italy.
