= Herculaneum =

Roman town destroyed by eruption of Mount Vesuvius

- Ercolano
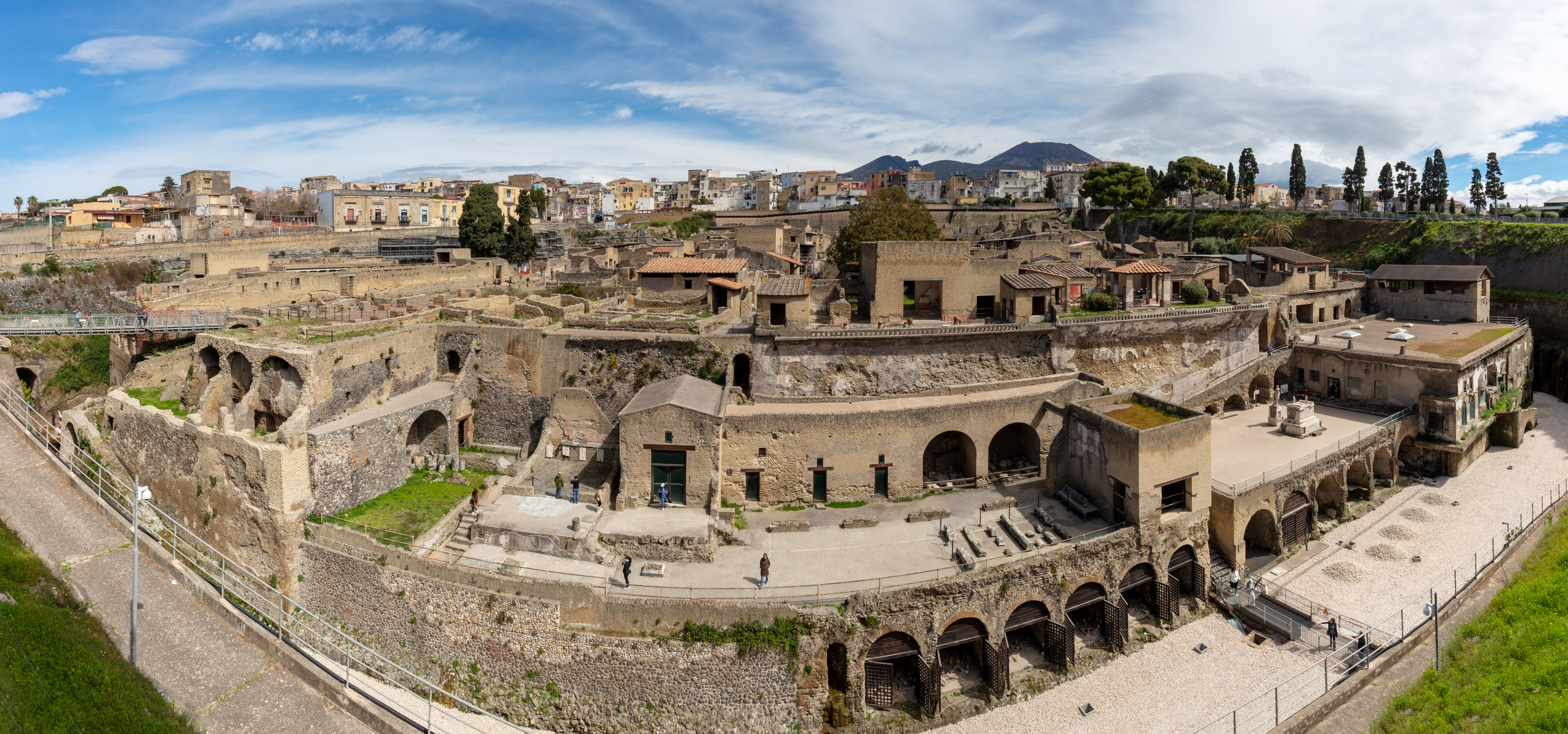
- The excavations of Herculaneum in 2023

- Location within Italy
- 40.8060°N 14.3482°E
- Type: Settlement
- Location: Ercolano, Campania, Italy

History
- Built: 6th–7th century BC
- Abandoned: 79 AD

Site notes
- Website: Herculaneum – Official website

UNESCO World Heritage Site
- Official name: Archaeological Areas of Pompeii, Herculaneum, and Torre Annunziata
- Type: Cultural
- Criteria: iii, iv, v
- Designated: 1997 (21st session)
- Reference no.: 829
- Region: Europe and North America

Herculaneum (Note: /hɜːrkjʊˈleɪniəm/; Neapolitan and Italian: Ercolano) is an ancient Roman town located in the modern-day comune of Ercolano, Campania, Italy. Herculaneum was buried under a massive pyroclastic flow in the eruption of Mount Vesuvius in 79 AD.

Like the nearby city of Pompeii, Herculaneum is notable as one of the few well-preserved ancient Roman cities, as the volcanic material that buried the town helped protect it from looting and weathering. Although less known than Pompeii today, it was the first discovered Vesuvian city. Unlike Pompeii (revealed in 1748 and identified in 1763), the mainly pyroclastic material that covered Herculaneum carbonized and so preserved more wooden objects such as roofs, beds, and doors, as well as other organic-based materials, including food and papyrus.

According to the traditional tale, the city was rediscovered by chance in 1709 during the drilling of a well. Remnants, however, were already found during earlier earthworks. In the years following the site's uncovering, treasure-seekers excavated tunnels and took artifacts. Regular excavations commenced in 1738 and have continued irregularly since, but still only a fraction of the site has been revealed. The focus has shifted to preserving already-excavated areas.

Although smaller than Pompeii, with a population of circa 5,000, Herculaneum was wealthier. It flourished as a seaside retreat for the Roman elite, reflected in an extraordinary density of luxurious houses and lavish use of coloured marble cladding. Noted buildings include the Villa of the Papyri and so-called "boat houses" in which skeletal remains of at least 300 people were found.

== History of Herculaneum ==
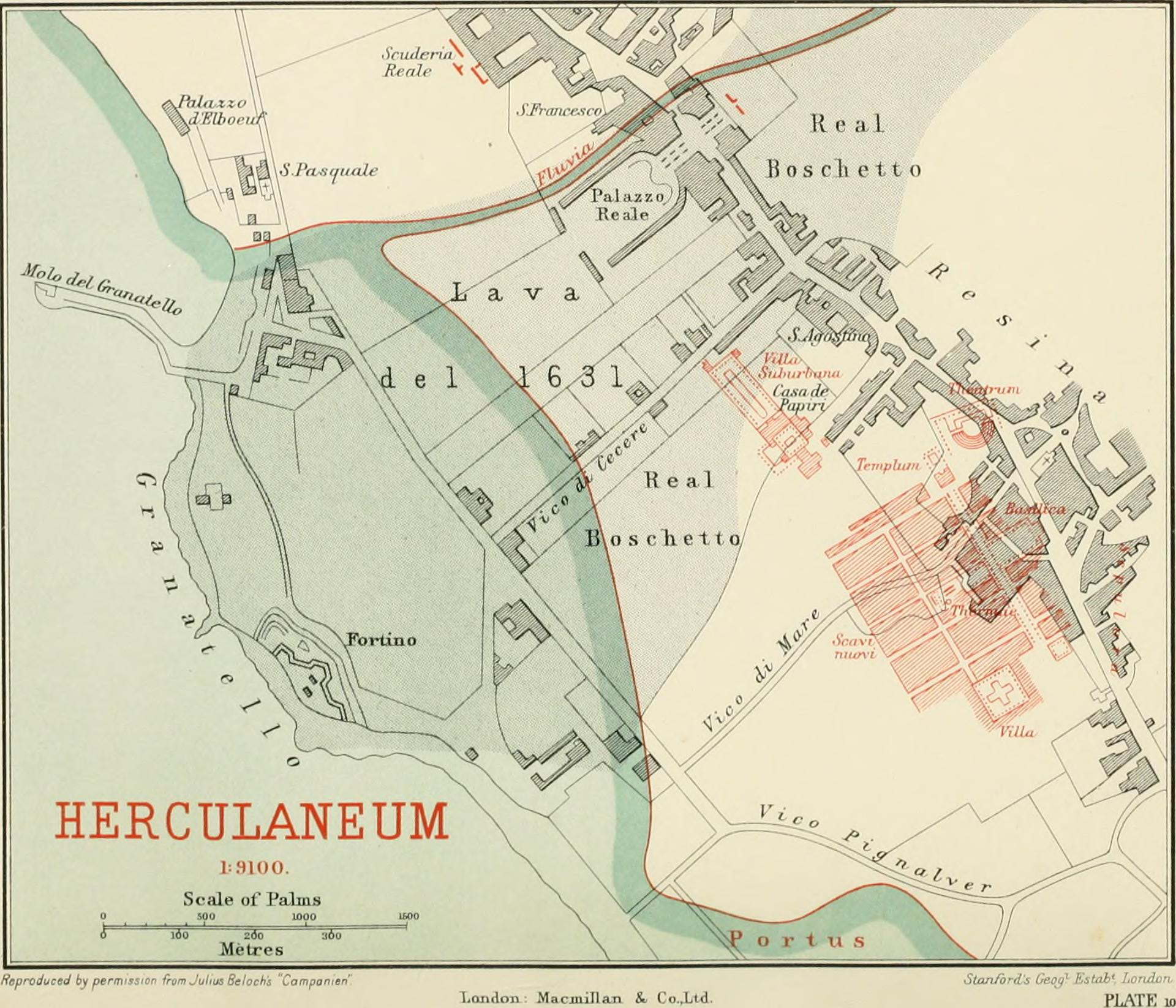
Herculaneum plan showing the ancient site below the modern (1908) town and the 1631 "lava" flow

Dionysius of Halicarnassus states that the Greek hero Heracles (Hercules in Latin) founded the city. However, according to Strabo, the Oscans founded the first settlement. The Etruscans took control of the area, and were later overthrown by the Greeks. The Greeks named the town Heraklion and used it as a trading post because of its proximity to the Gulf of Naples. In the 4th century BC, Herculaneum came under the domination of the Samnites.

In the 2nd century BC the city walls were built (between 2 and 3 metres thick), constructed primarily of large pebbles, with the exception of the coastal section made of opus reticulatum. It participated in the Social War (91–88 BC) on the side of the "Allies" against Rome and was defeated by Titus Didius, a legate of Sulla. Following the war the walls lost their protective purpose and were integrated into houses and adjacent structures, such as the House of the Inn.

It became a Roman municipium in 89 BC.

The eruption of Mount Vesuvius in AD 79 buried Herculaneum under approximately 20 m (66 ft) of ash. It lay hidden and largely intact until discoveries from wells and tunnels became gradually more widely known, notably following the Prince d'Elbeuf's explorations in the early 18th century. Excavations continued sporadically up to the present and today many streets and buildings are visible, although over 75% of the town remains buried. Today, the Italian towns of Ercolano and Portici lie above Herculaneum. Ercolano was called Resina until 1969 when the modern name was adopted in honour of the old city.

=== Eruption of 79 AD ===
Herculaneum and other cities affected by the eruption of Mount Vesuvius. The black cloud represents the general distribution of ash and cinder. Modern coast lines are shown.

The course and timeline of the eruption can be reconstructed based on archaeological excavations and two letters from Pliny the Younger to the Roman historian Tacitus.

At around 1 pm on the first day of eruption, Mount Vesuvius began spewing volcanic material thousands of metres into the sky. After the plume had reached a height of 27–33 km (17–21 mi), the top of the column flattened, prompting Pliny to describe it to Tacitus as a stone pine tree. The prevailing winds at the time blew toward the southeast, causing the volcanic material to fall primarily on the city of Pompeii and the surrounding area. Since Herculaneum lay west of Vesuvius, it was only mildly affected by the first phase of the eruption. While roofs in Pompeii collapsed under the weight of falling debris, only a few centimetres of ash fell on Herculaneum, causing little damage; nevertheless, the ash prompted most inhabitants to flee.

The volcano continued spewing up a high-altitude column from which ash and pumice began to fall, blanketing the area. At 1 am the next day, the eruptive column collapsed onto Vesuvius and its flanks. The first pyroclastic surge, formed by a mixture of ash and hot gases, flowed down the mountain and through the mostly-evacuated town of Herculaneum at 160 km/h (100 mph). A succession of six flows and surges buried the city's buildings to approximately 20 m (66 ft) depth, causing little damage in some areas and preserving structures, objects and victims almost intact. However, other areas were damaged significantly, knocking down walls, tearing away columns and other large objects; a marble statue of Marcus Nonius Balbus near the baths was blown 15 m (49 ft) away and a carbonised skeleton was found lifted 2.5 m (8 ft 2 in) above ground level in the garden of the House of the Relief of Telephus.

The date of the eruption has been shown to be on or after 17 October. Support for an October/November eruption has long been known in several respects: buried people in the ash were wearing heavier clothing than the light summer clothes typical of August; fresh fruit and vegetables in the shops are typical of October – and conversely the summer fruit typical of August was already being sold in dried, or conserved form. Wine fermenting jars had been sealed, which would have happened around the end of October; coins found in the purse of a woman buried in the ash include one with a 15th imperatorial acclamation among the emperor's titles and could not have been minted before the second week of September.

Multidisciplinary research on the lethal effects of the pyroclastic surges in the Vesuvius area has shown that, in the vicinity of Pompeii and Herculaneum, intense heat was the main cause of the death of people who had previously been thought to have died by ash suffocation. Exposure to ≥250 °C (480 °F) had likely killed residents within 10 km, including those sheltering in buildings.

=== Archaeology ===
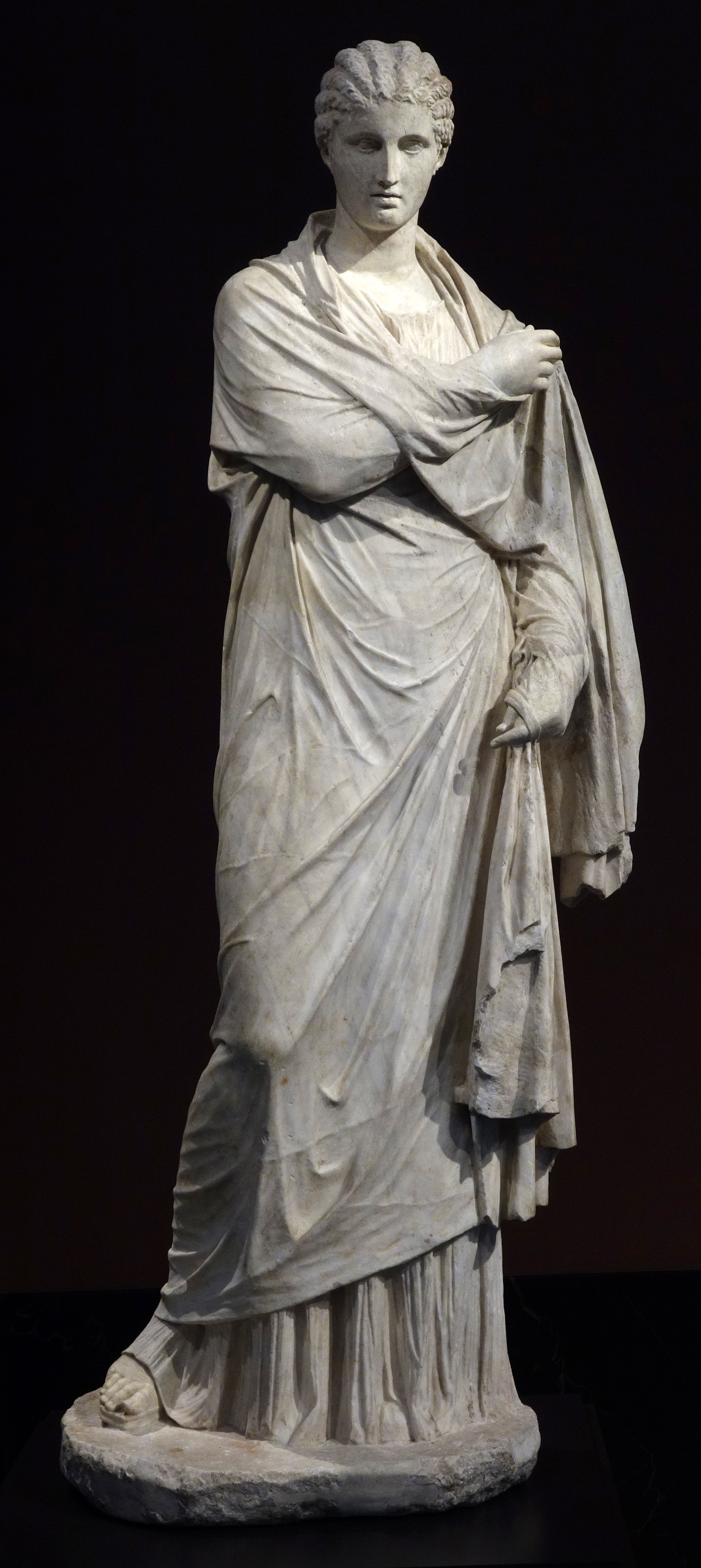
Small Herculaneum Woman (Dresden)

Prince d'Elbeuf began constructing a villa in neighbouring Granatello, and to furnish it, he grew intrigued in local tales of wells containing antique sculptures and artworks. In 1709, he acquired the site of a recently dug well and tunnelled out from its bottom in search of sculptures. The tunnel reached what would be later identified as a theatre, where remarkable sculptures were uncovered. Among the earliest sculptures discovered were two exquisitely carved Herculaneum women, currently housed in the Skulpturensammlung in Dresden. The excavation ceased in 1711 out of concern about the stability of the structures above.

Major excavations resumed in 1738 under the patronage of Charles III of Spain, who had recently begun building his nearby palace in Portici. He appointed the Italian military engineer Giovanni Antonio Medrano and Roque Joaquin de Alcubierre to supervise the extensive new project. The publication of "Le Antichità di Ercolano" ("The Antiquities of Herculaneum") had a striking influence on nascent European Neoclassicism; by the end of the 18th century, motifs from Herculaneum began to appear on fashionable furnishings, including decorative wall-paintings, tripod tables, perfume burners, and teacups. Nonetheless, excavation ceased once again in 1762 as a result of Winckelmann's harsh criticism of the treasure-hunting techniques. The discovery of neighbouring Pompeii, substantially simpler to excavate due to a smaller layer of material covering the site (4m as compared to 20m at Herculaneum), diverted attention and effort.

King Francis I ordered land acquisitions and promoted renewed excavations between 1828 and 1837. Acquisitions continued under the newly formed Kingdom of Italy, extending excavations eastwards till 1875.

From 1927 until 1942, Amedeo Maiuri conducted a new campaign, sponsored by Mussolini's regime, which unearthed approximately four hectares which today are part of the archaeological park.

Hundreds of skeletons were found in the so-called "boat houses", by the ancient shoreline, between 1980 and 1981. The excavation was led by archaeologist Giuseppe Maggi.

The Villa of the Papyri, the northwest baths, the House of the Dionysian Reliefs and a large collapsed monument were brought to light between 1996 and 1999. However, the area was left in a chaotic state until major conservation interventions from 2000 through 2007.

Many public and private buildings, including the forum complex, are yet to be excavated.

== The city ==
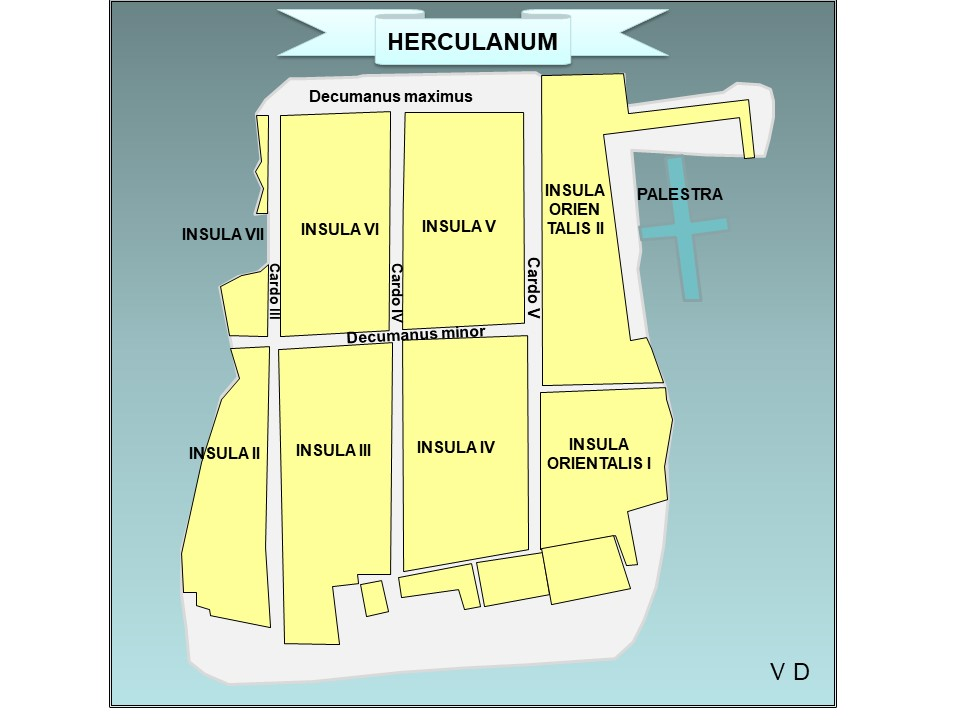
Insulae numbers of main excavated area

The classical street layout separates the city into blocks (insulae), defined by the intersection of the east–west (cardi) and north–south (decumani) streets. Hence Insula II to Insula VII run counterclockwise from Insula II. To the east are two additional blocks: Orientalis I (oI) and Orientalis II (oII). To the south of Orientalis I (oI) lies one additional group of buildings known as the "Suburban District" (SD). Individual buildings have their own entrance number. For example, the House of the Deer is labelled (Ins IV, 3).

The Forum, temples, theatre, numerous houses and necropoles are still buried.

Due to bradyseism, which affects the entire Vesuvius region, portions of the historic city of Herculaneum today lie as much as 4 metres below sea level.

A single main drain collected water from the Forum and from house impluviums, latrines and kitchens along Cardo III. Other drains emptied directly into the street, except latrines equipped with a cesspit. For water supply, the city was directly connected to the Serino aqueduct, built in the Augustan age, which brought water to buildings through a series of lead pipes under the roads, regulated by valves; wells had been used previously.

=== The House of Aristides (Ins II, 1) ===
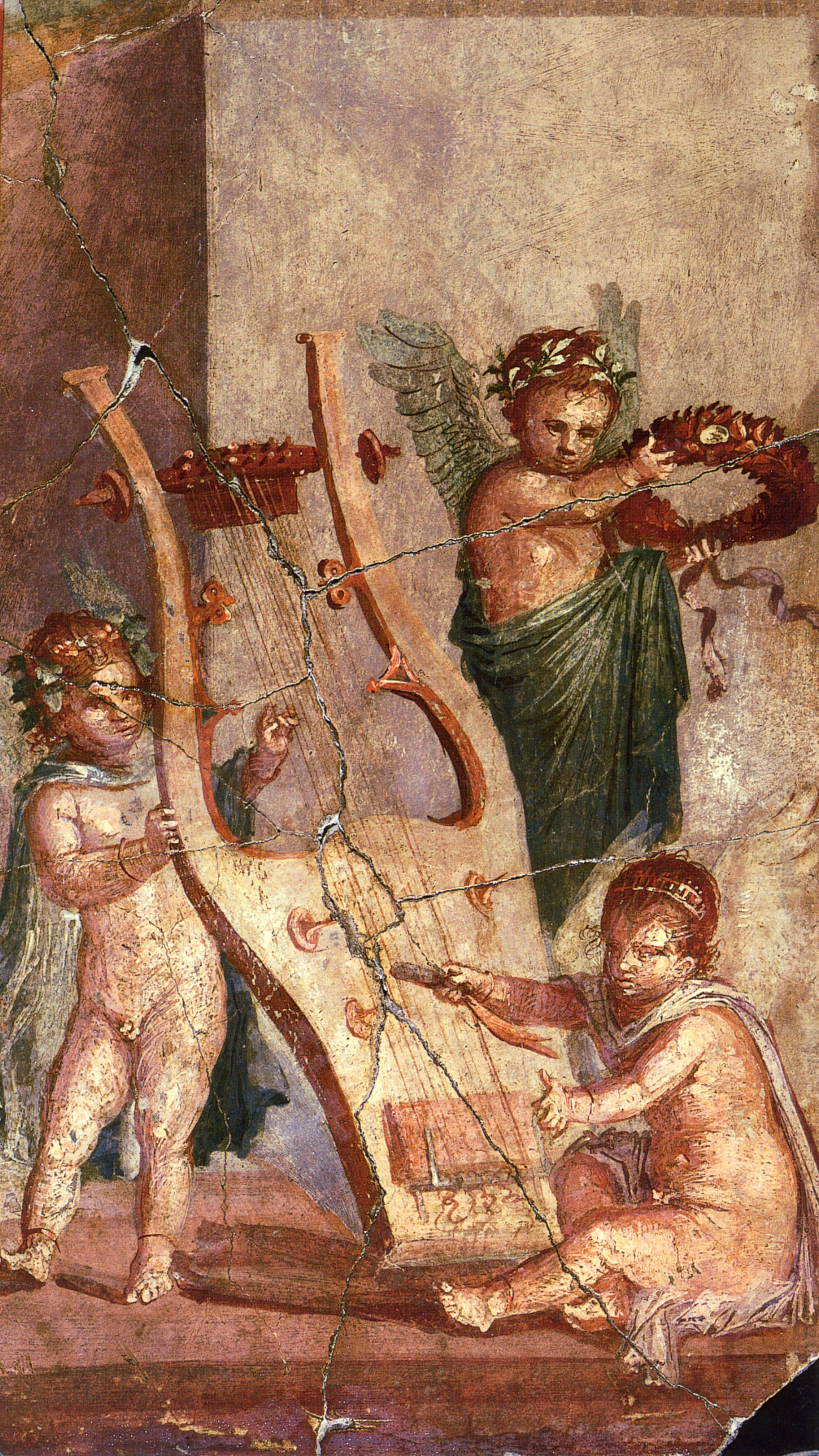
Cupids playing with a kithara. Roman fresco from Herculaneum

The first building in insula II is the House of Aristides. The entrance opens directly onto the atrium, but the ruins are not well preserved due to damage caused by previous excavations. The lower floor was probably used for storage.

=== The House of Argus (Ins II, 2) ===
The second house in insula II takes its name from a lost fresco of Argus and Io that once adorned a reception room off the large peristyle. This structure was likely one of Herculaneum's finest villas. It was the first time that a second story had been unearthed in such detail when the house was discovered in the late 1820s. The excavation uncovered a balcony on the second level overlooking Cardo III, as well as wooden shelving and cupboards now lost.

=== The House of the Genius (Ins II, 3) ===
North of the House of Argus lies the House of the Genius. Although it has only been partially uncovered, it appears to have been a vast structure. Its name derives from a statue of a Cupid, once part of a candlestick. In the centre of the peristyle are the remains of a rectangular basin.

=== The House of the Alcove (Ins IV) ===
The house consists of two adjoined structures with a mix of plain, simple spaces and finely-decorated rooms.

The atrium is covered and lacks the usual impluvium. It retains its original flooring of opus tesselatum and opus sectile. A highly adorned biclinium (a dining-couch for two persons) with frescoes in the fourth style and a spacious triclinium originally marble-floored are found off the atrium. Several further rooms, including the apsed alcove after which the house is named, are accessible via a corridor receiving daylight from a small courtyard.

=== College of the Augustales ===
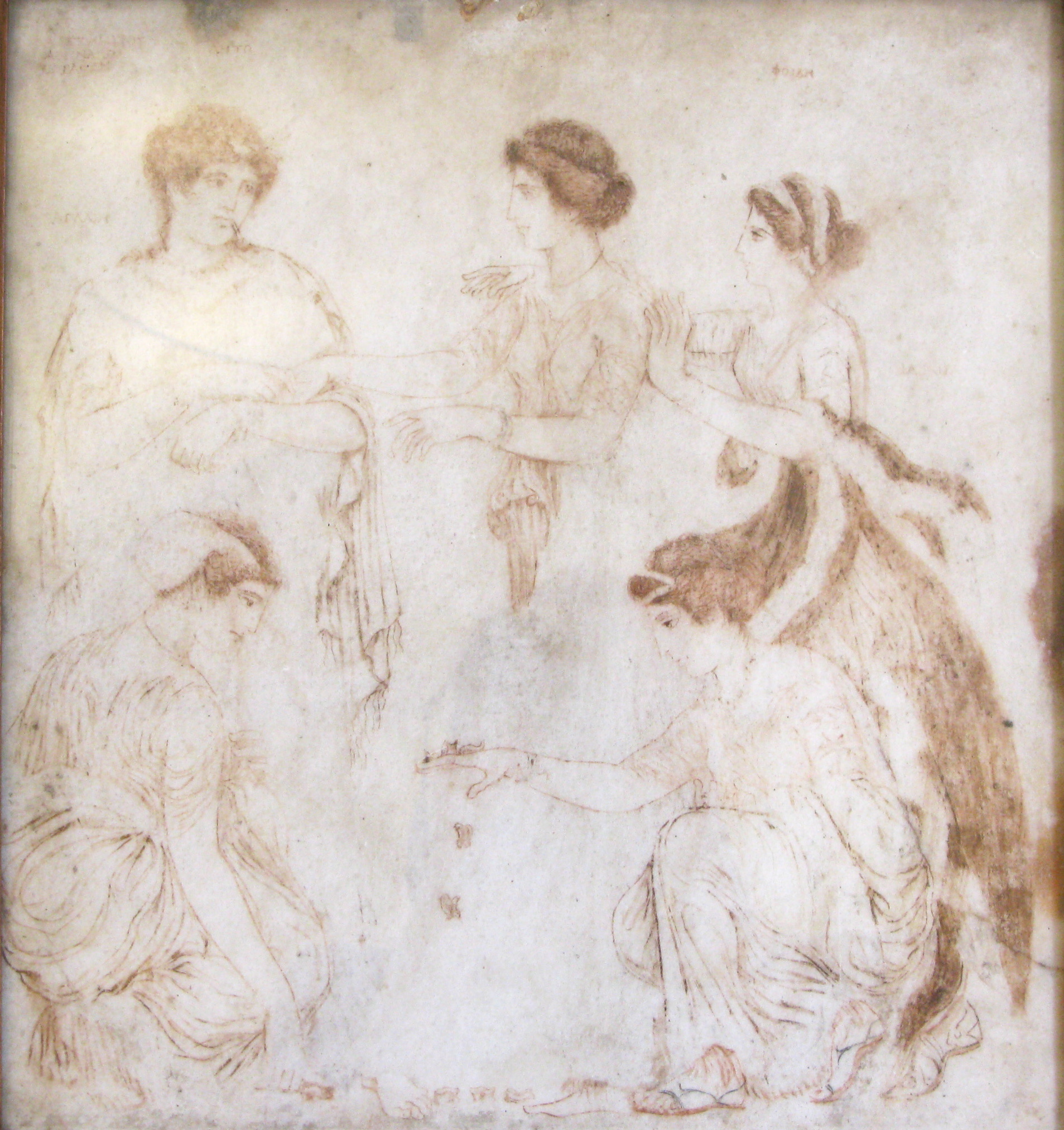
A marble tablet from Herculaneum showing women playing knucklebones, depicting Phoebe, Leto, Niobe, Hilearia, and Agle, painted and signed by an artist named "Alexander of Athens", now in the Museo Archeologico Nazionale (Naples)

Temple of the Augustales or priests of the Imperial cult.

=== Central Baths ===
The Central baths (thermae) were built around the 1st century AD. There were separate bathing areas for men and women. The thermae also served as a prominent cultural hub.

=== Villa of the Papyri ===
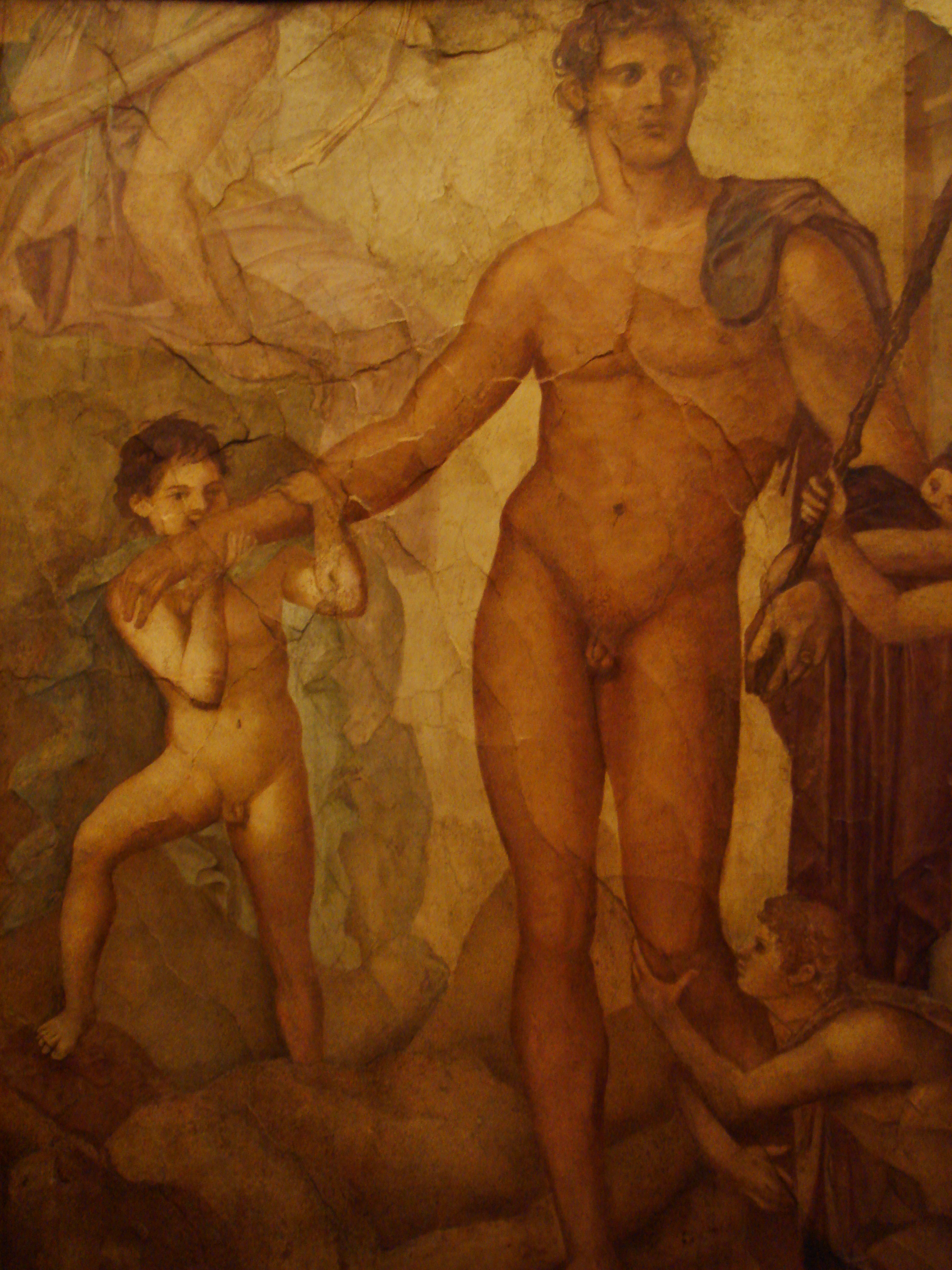
A fresco depicting Theseus

The famous Villa of the Papyri, was built on the seashore on four terraces. It is thought to have belonged to consul Lucius Calpurnius Piso Caesoninus, Julius Caesar's father-in-law, who was a patron of poets and philosophers and built there the only ancient library that has survived virtually intact.

Between 1752 and 1754, a number of blackened, unreadable papyrus scrolls were recovered from the Villa of the Papyri by workmen. These scrolls became known as the Herculaneum papyri or scrolls, the majority of which are today stored at the National Library, Naples. Although badly carbonized, a number of scrolls have been unrolled with varying degrees of success. Computer-enhanced multi-spectral infrared imaging helped make the ink legible. There is now a real prospect that it will be possible to read the unopened rolls using X-rays. The same techniques could be applied to the rolls waiting to be discovered in the as-yet unexcavated part of the villa, eliminating the risk of potential damage from unrolling. Later CT scan revealed the scrolls' fibres structure, sand, and other debris trapped in the scrolls. These findings help a safer unrolling. However, the text remains illegible.

Two of the rolls stored at the French National Academy in Paris have been extensively examined by X-ray in summer 2009. However, the text imaging failed because Roman writers likely used carbon-based inks, essentially invisible to the X-ray scans. Similar later attempts all failed.

In 2015, a team of scientists managed to increase the contrast between the carbon ink and the carbon-based papyrus using X-ray Phase Contrast Tomography, and read Greek words along the outer papyrus, marking "a revolution for papyrologists". While researchers can identify certain words on the scrolls, the stories on the scrolls cannot yet be unlocked.

In 2024 the winners of a contest called the Vesuvius Challenge, with the help of AI, managed to reveal hundreds of words across 15 columns of text, corresponding to around 5% of a scroll.

=== Boathouses and the Shore ===
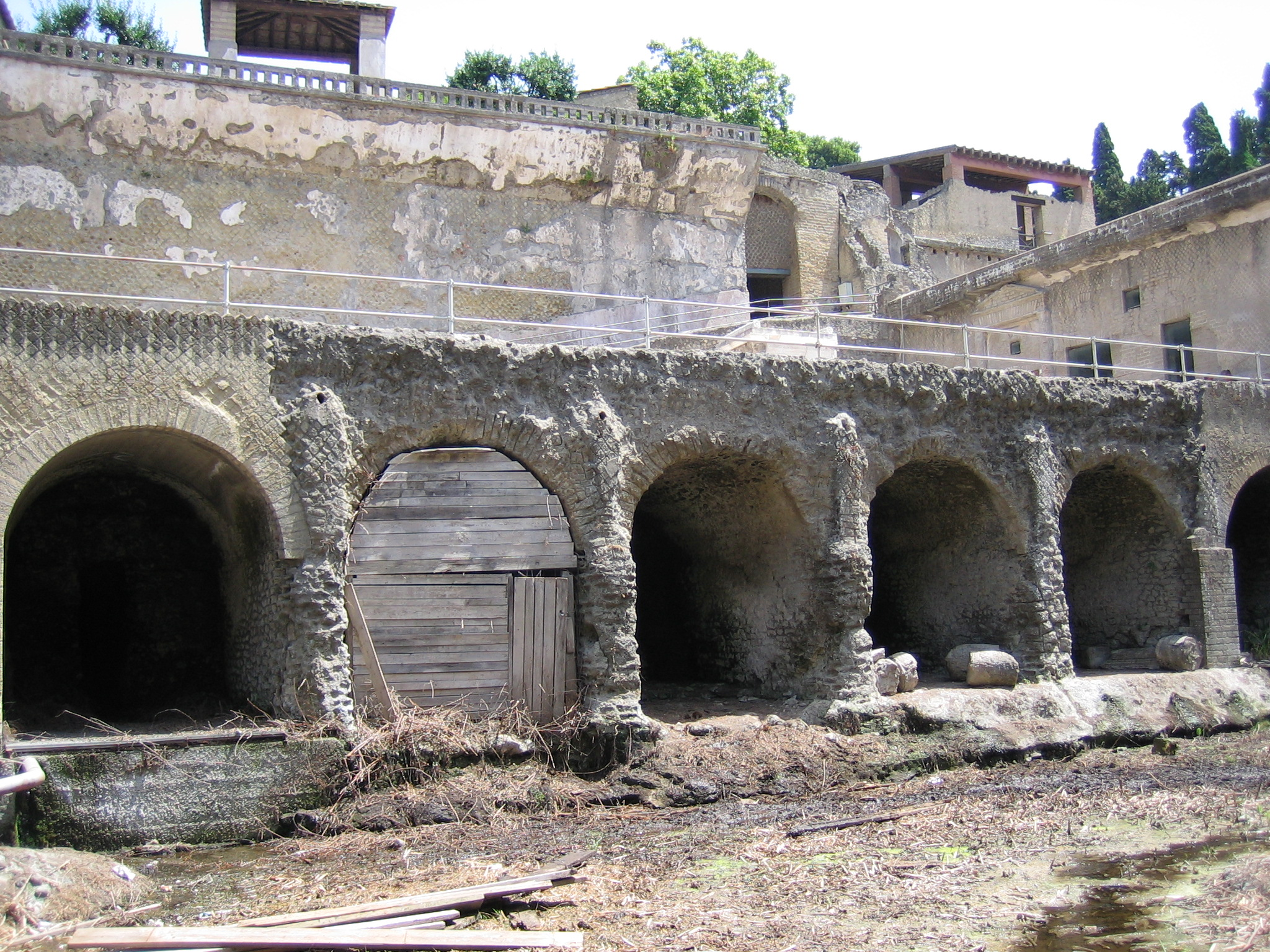
"Boat houses" where skeletons were found

In 1980–82, excavations initially turned up more than 55 skeletons on the ancient beach (just in front of the city walls) and in the first six so-called "boat sheds". Long before this finding, it was believed that the majority of the town's inhabitants had managed to flee, as only a few skeletons had been unearthed during the excavations. However, this discovery led to a shift in perspective. The last inhabitants waiting for rescue from the sea were probably killed instantly by the intense heat of the pyroclastic flow, despite being sheltered from direct impact. A study of victims' postures and the effects on their skeletons seemed to indicate that the first surge caused instant death as a result of fulminant shock due to a temperature of about 500 °C (930 °F). Extreme heat caused hands and feet to contract and perhaps fractured bones and teeth.

After a period of finds being mismanaged and deterioration of skeletons, further excavations in the 1990s uncovered 296 skeletons on the beach or huddled in 9 of the 12 stone vaults facing the sea. While the town was almost completely evacuated, these people found themselves trapped. The "Ring Lady", named for the rings on her fingers, was discovered there in 1982.

Eventually, 340 bodies were identified in this area. Analyses of the skeletons suggest it was mainly men who died on the beach, while women and children sheltered and died in the boat houses.

A scientific study, published in 2021, showed that chemical analysis of the remains was able to provide further insights into the health and nutrition of Herculaneum's population. Stable isotope analysis of bone samples from 17 individuals (11 men and 6 women) revealed the men ate 1.6 times more fish than the women, who consumed more meat, eggs, and dairy; this fits into the wider dietary trend from Herculaneum and Roman Italy.

Casts of skeletons were also produced to replace the original bones after taphonomic study, scientific documentation and excavation. In contrast to Pompeii, where casts resembling the body features of the victims were produced by filling hollowed spaces of the body imprints in the ash deposit with plaster, the shape of corpses at Herculaneum could not be preserved due to the rapid vaporisation and replacement of the flesh of the victims by the hot ash (ca. 500 °C). A cast of the skeletons unearthed in chamber 10 is on display at the Museum of Anthropology in Naples.

Of exceptional interest is the analysis, published in 2021, of one of the skeletons (n. 26) discovered in 1982 on the beach next to a boat (on display in the boat pavilion). The remains belong to a military officer (with an elaborate dagger and belt), who was perhaps involved in a rescue mission.

== Issues of conservation ==
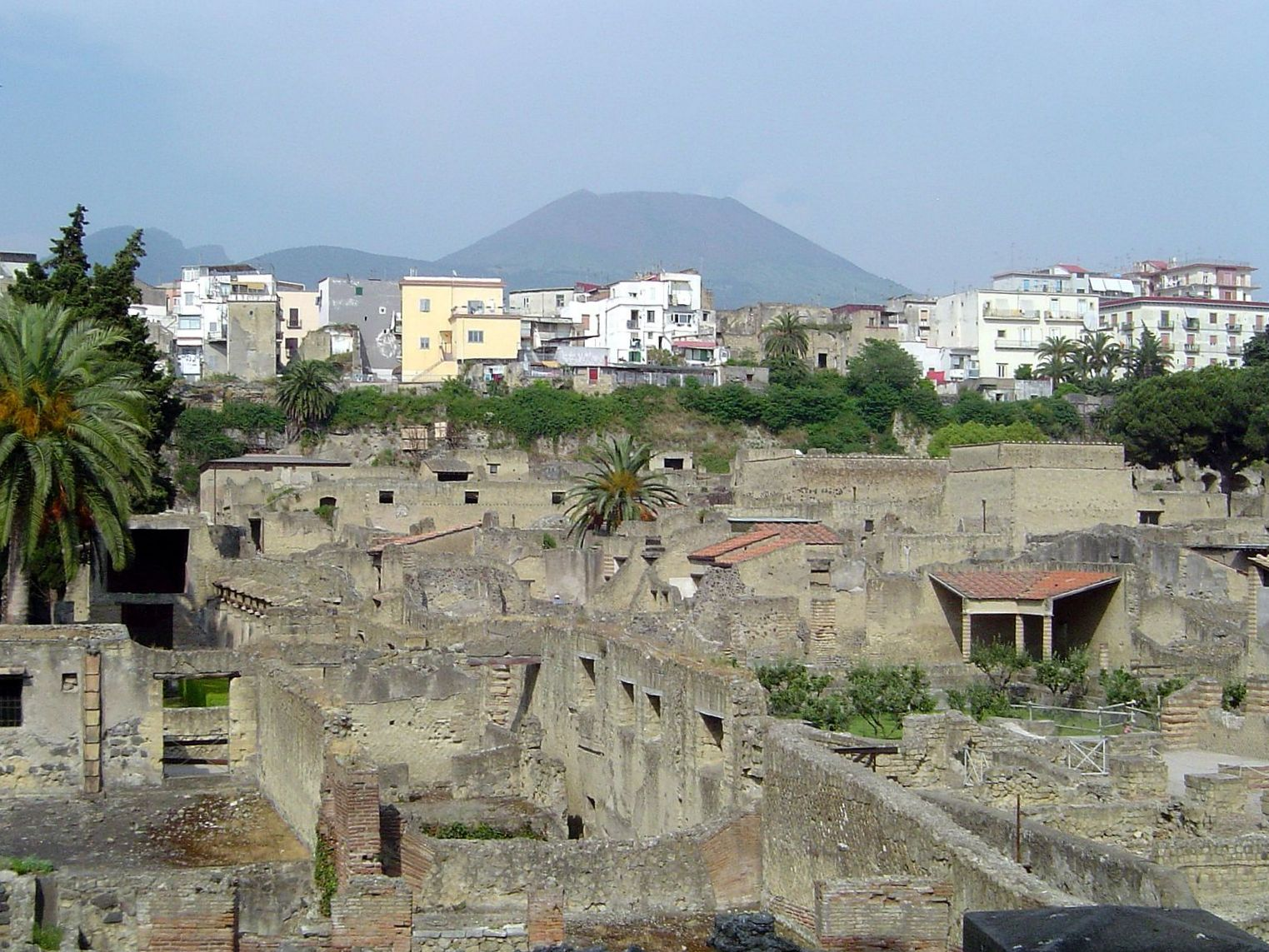
Herculaneum, Ercolano, and Vesuvius

The volcanic ash and debris covering Herculaneum, along with the extreme heat, left it in a remarkable state of preservation for over 1,600 years. However, once excavations began, exposure to the elements began the slow process of deterioration. This was exacerbated by earlier excavation practices, which generally focused on valuable artifacts rather than preserving the archaeological value of the site. Preservation of the skeletal remains became a top priority only in the early 1980s, under the direction of Sara C. Bisel.

Intensive tourism, vandalism, substandard management, and political ineptitude contributed to the deterioration of numerous sites and buildings. Numerous building foundations have been weakened by water damage caused by modern Ercolano. Reconstruction initiatives have often proved counterproductive. However, recent conservation efforts have had greater success. Excavations have been temporarily discontinued to direct all funding to conservation programs.

A large number of artifacts from Herculaneum are preserved in the Naples National Archaeological Museum.

=== Modern conservation ===
After years of mismanagement, Herculaneum fell into a dire state. However, in 2001, the Packard Humanities Institute began the Herculaneum Conservation Project, a private–public partnership initially set to provide financial aid to local authorities addressing critical issues. The program eventually shifted to include providing skilled expert support and formulating a long-term plan for the site. Since 2001, the Herculaneum Conservation Project has been involved in pilot conservation projects and has partnered with the British School at Rome for training students to maintain the site.

One of the pilot projects started by the Conservation Project was on the tablinum that had been conserved by Maiuri's team in 1938. Over time water had seeped into the wall causing the paint to attach to the previously applied wax and curl away from the wall, stripping it of its colour. However, after working in tandem with the Getty Museum, conservators have created a technique where solvents are used to remove some of the wax and lessen the buildup on the walls so that the paint no longer chips off.

== Gallery ==
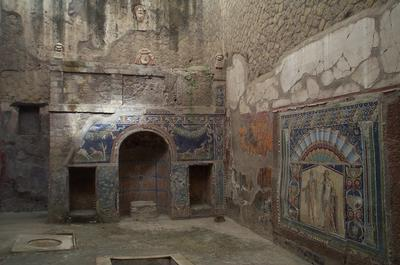
House Number 22 is noted for this outstanding summer triclinium with a nymphaeum decorated with coloured mosaics.

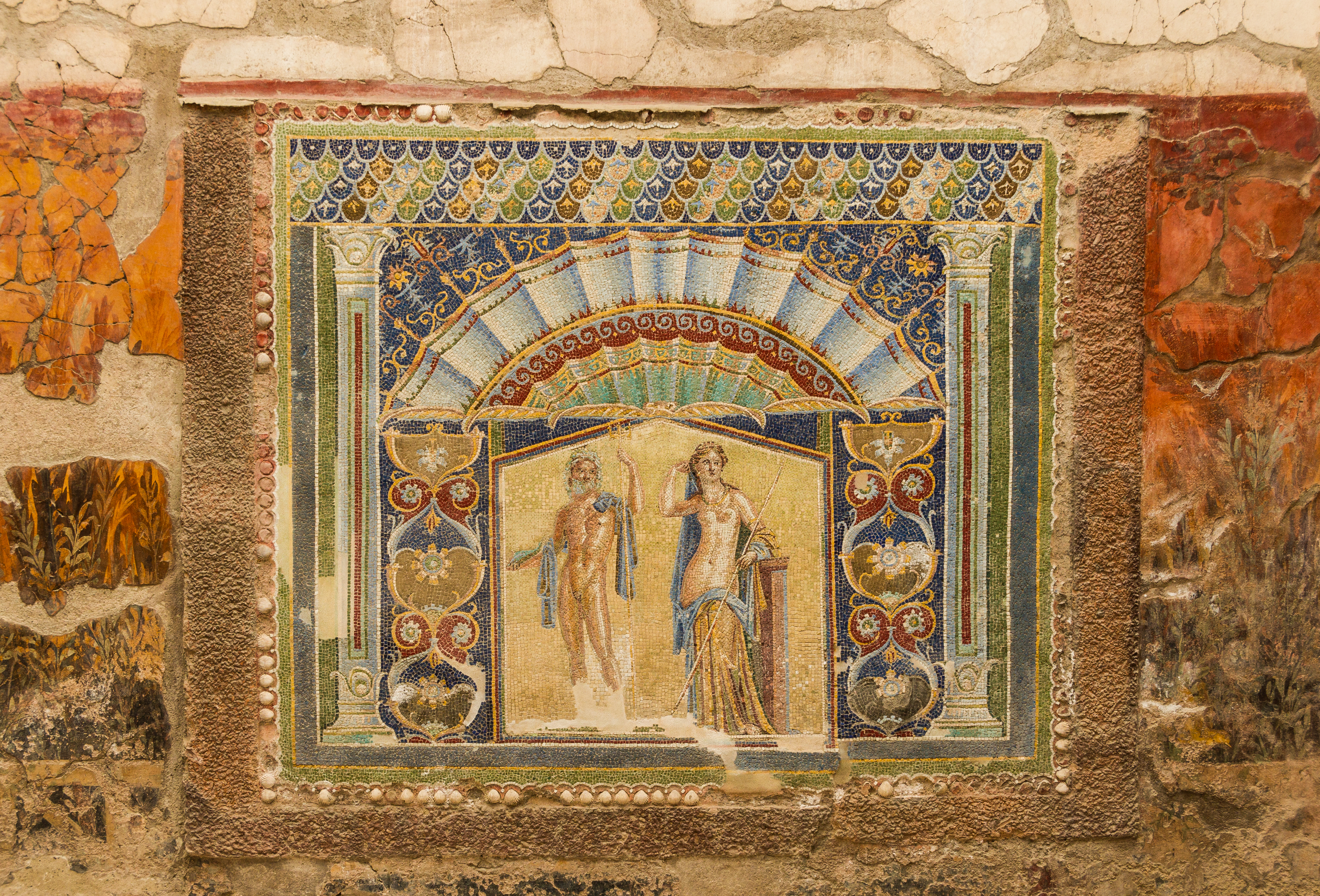
Herculaneum, Neptune and Salacia, wall mosaic in House Number 22

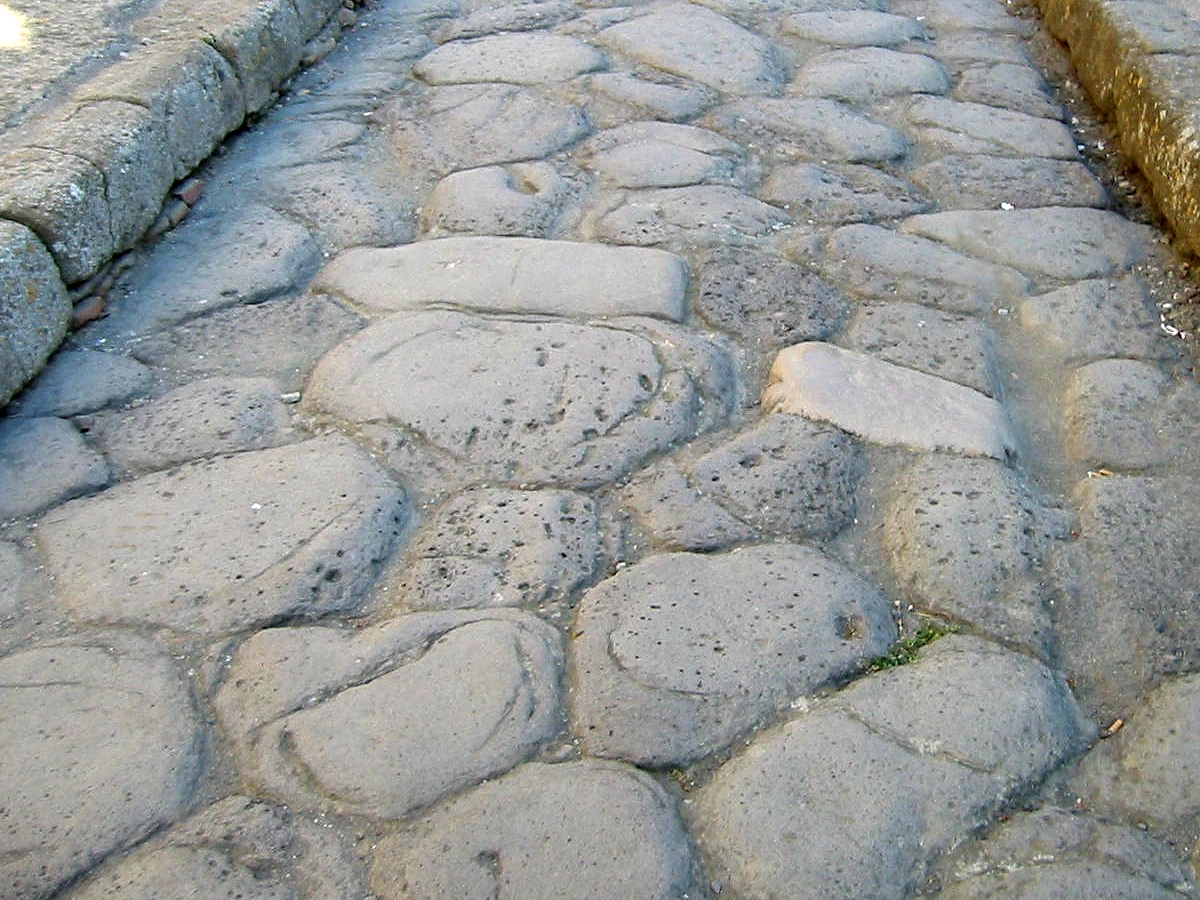
Street paving stones in Herculaneum

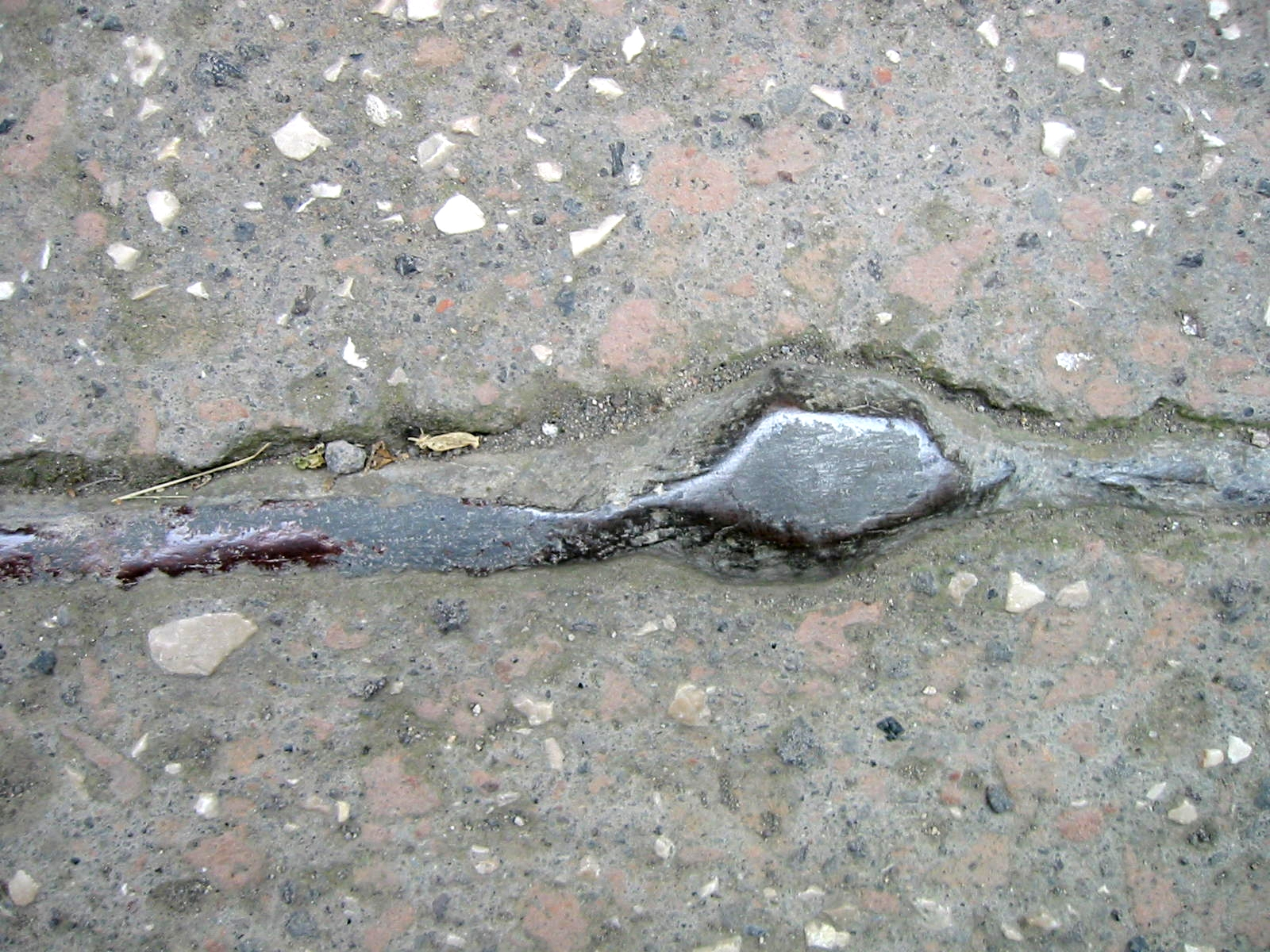
Residential water pipe made of lead in Herculaneum

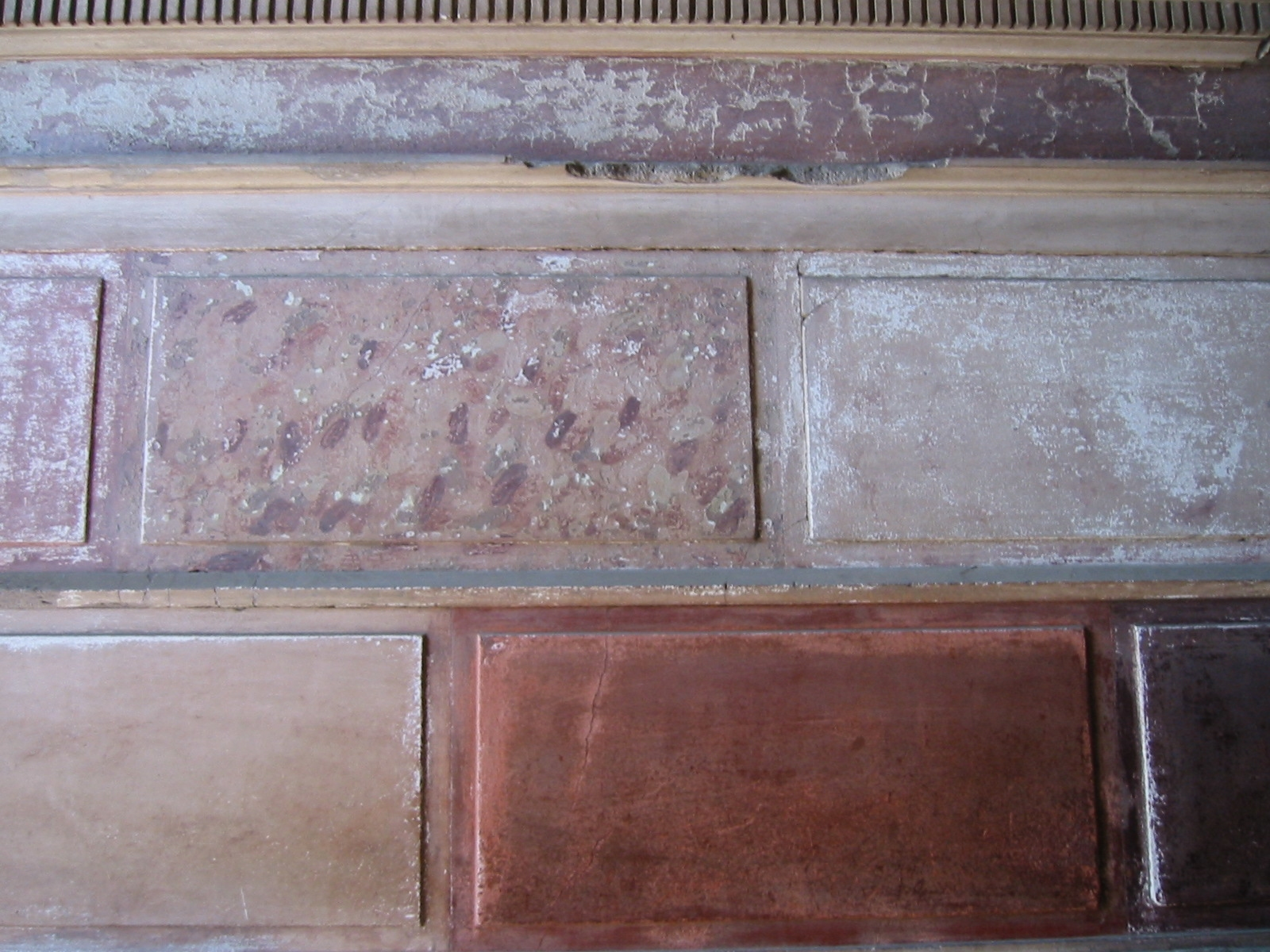
Wall paintings in the first style

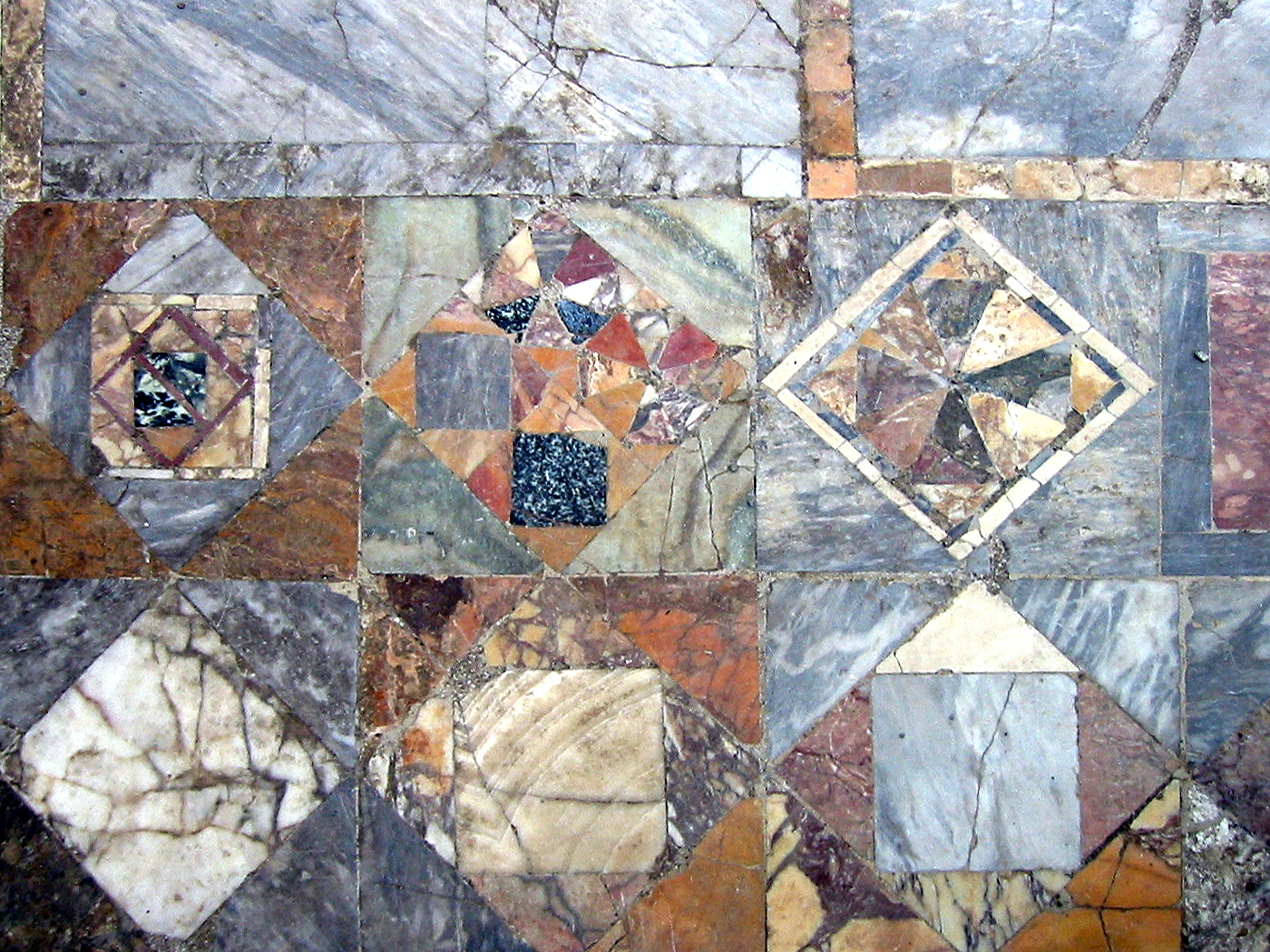
Inlaid marble floor

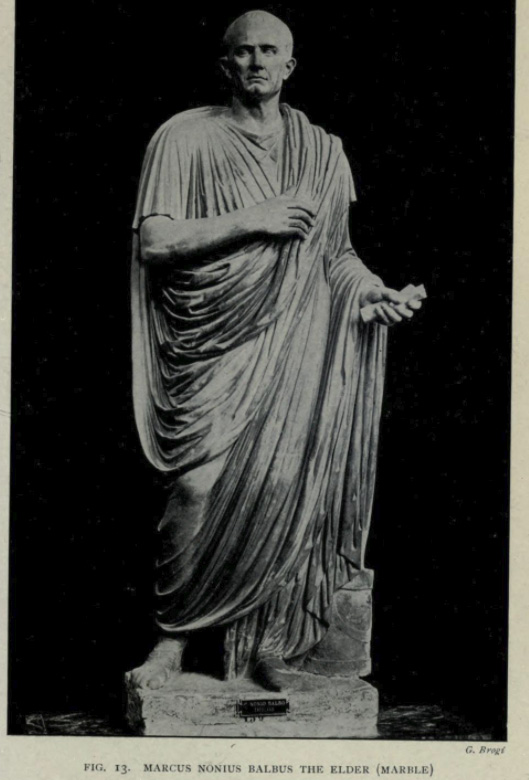
Marcus Nonius Balbus, found in dwellings of Resina/Herculaneum.

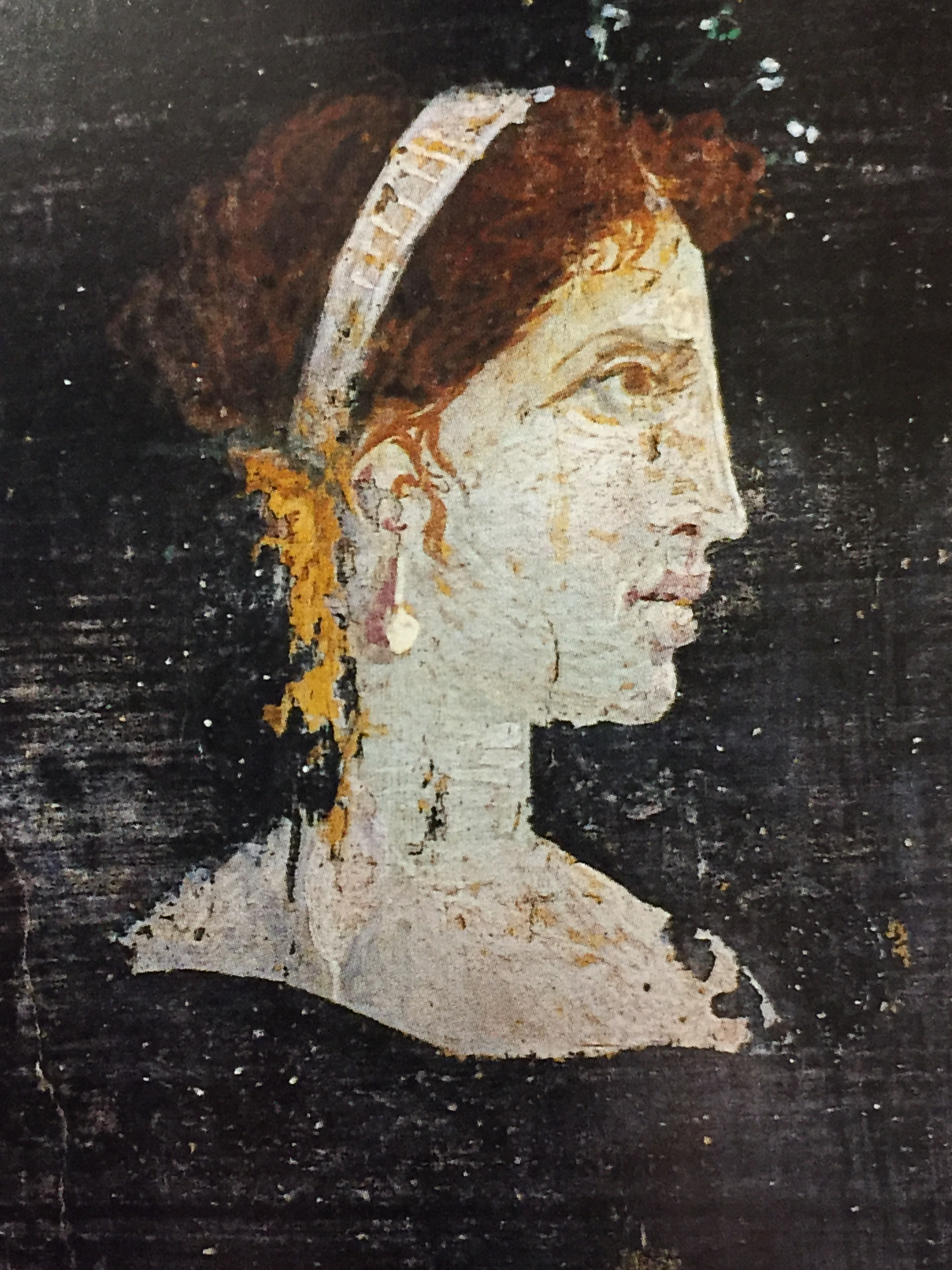
Most likely a posthumous painted portrait of Cleopatra VII of Ptolemaic Egypt with red hair and her distinct facial features, wearing a royal diadem and pearl-studded hairpins, from Roman Herculaneum, mid-1st century AD

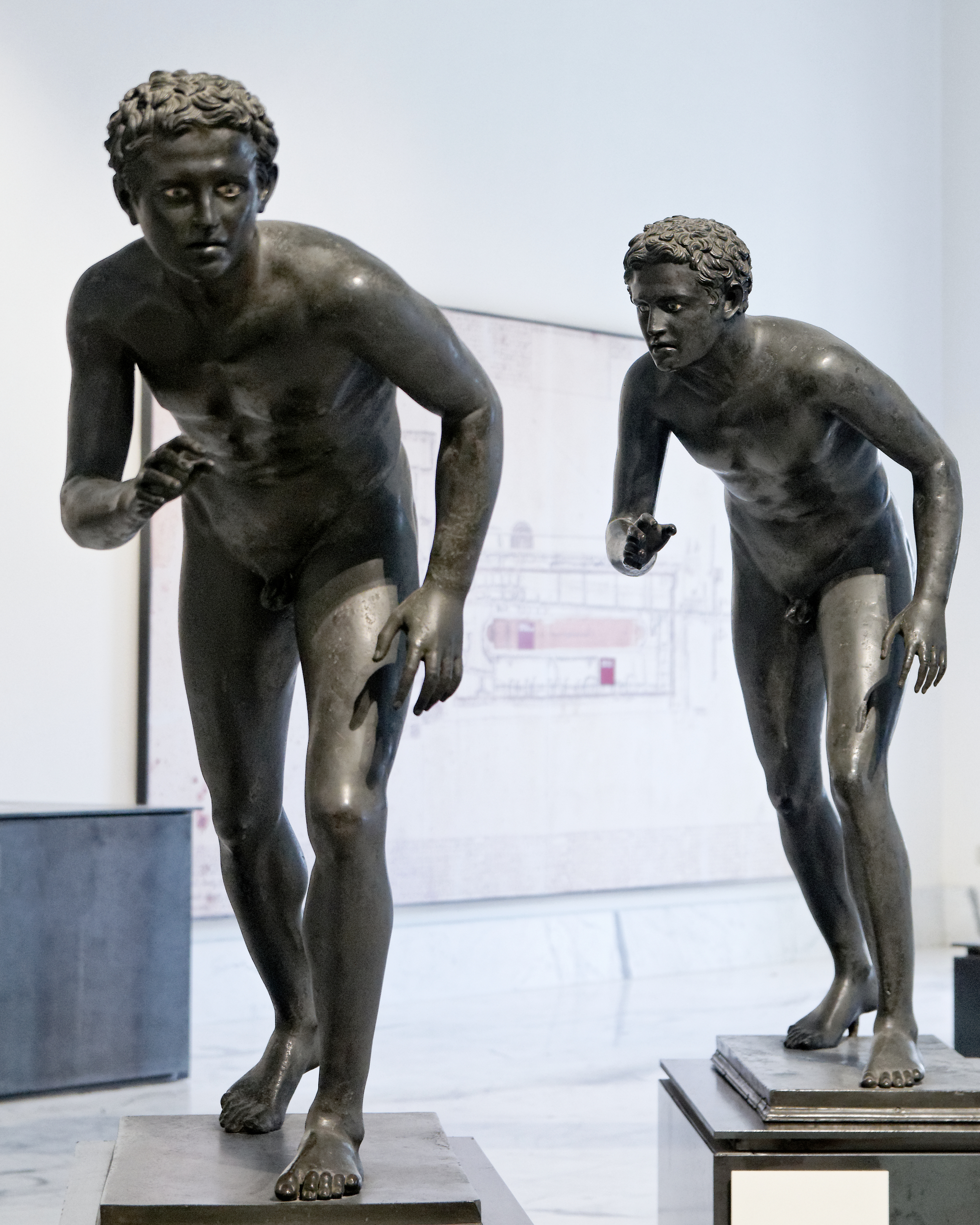
Bronze sculptures of runners from the Villa of the Papyri at Herculaneum, now in the Naples National Archaeological Museum

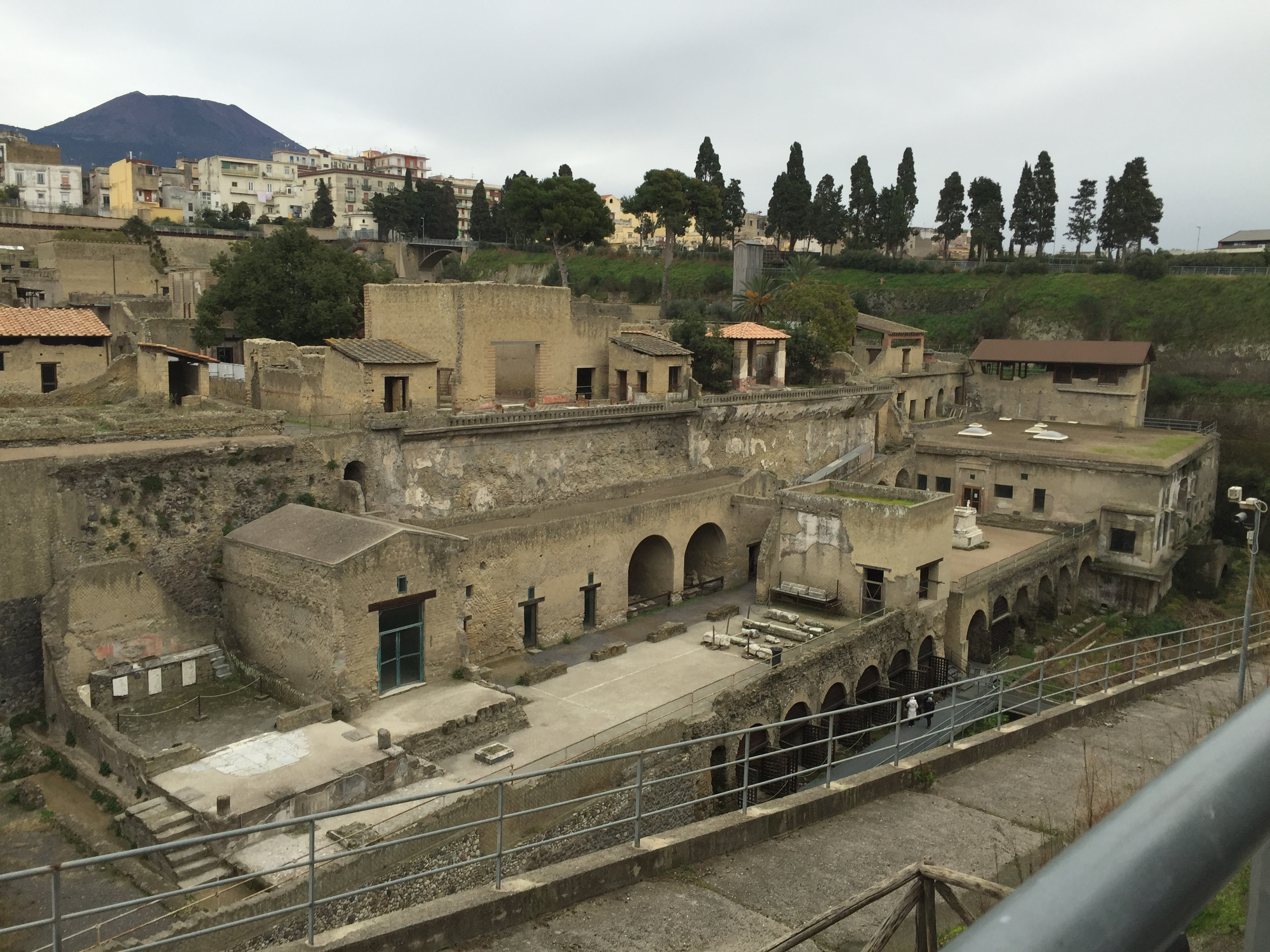
View from above Herculaneum showing the docks

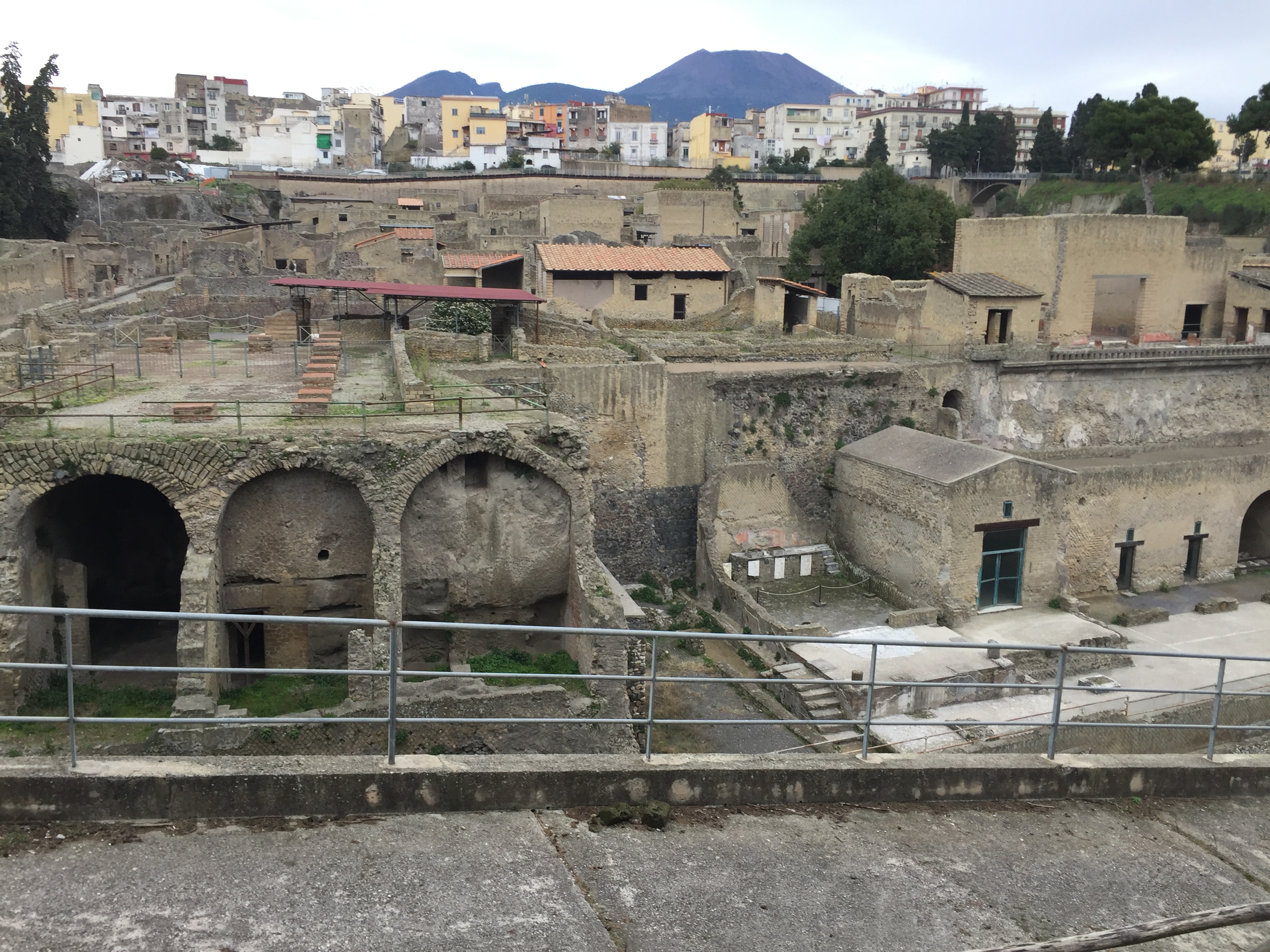
View from above Herculaneum with Mt. Vesuvius in the background

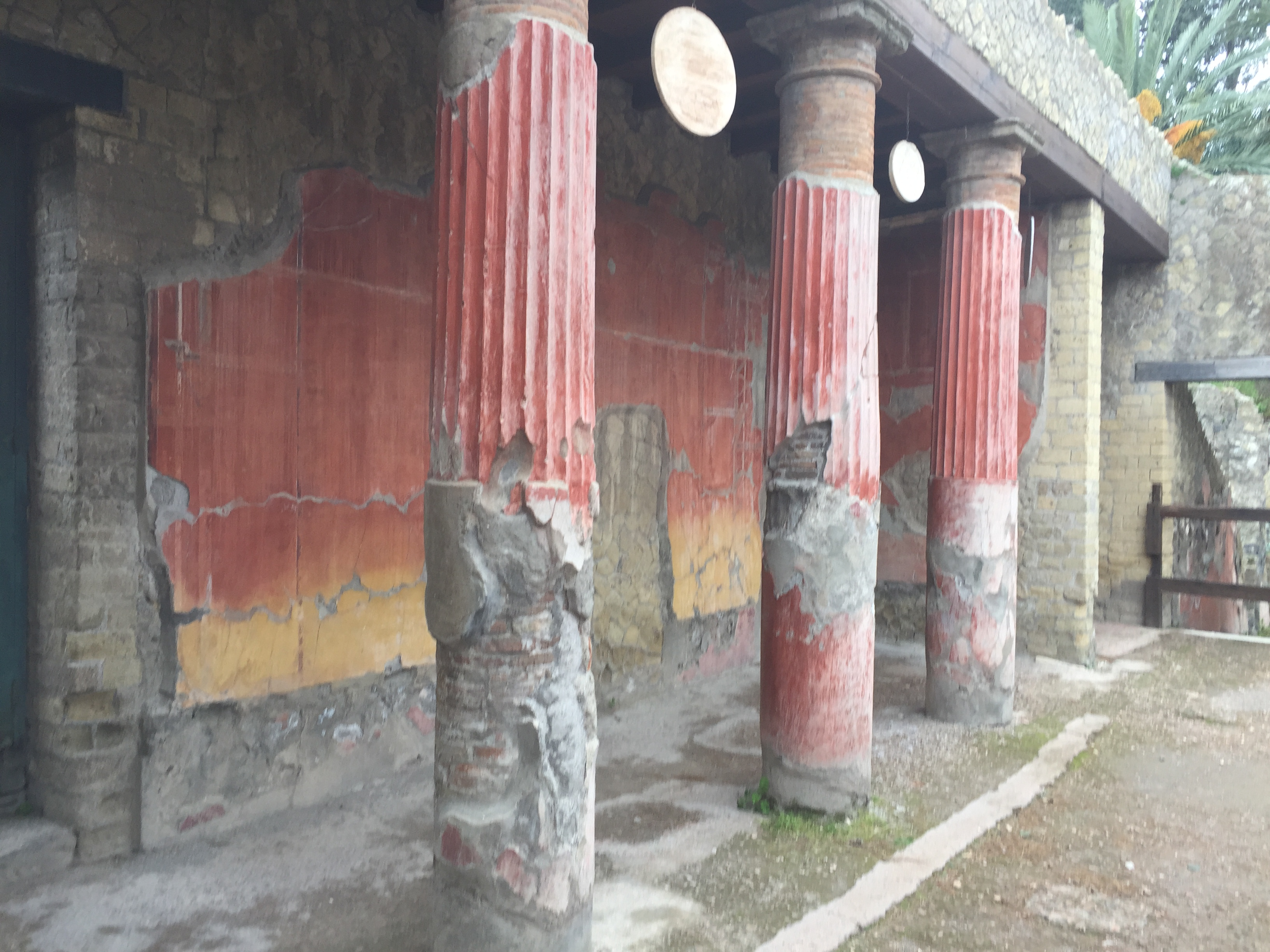
Still-standing columns with paint

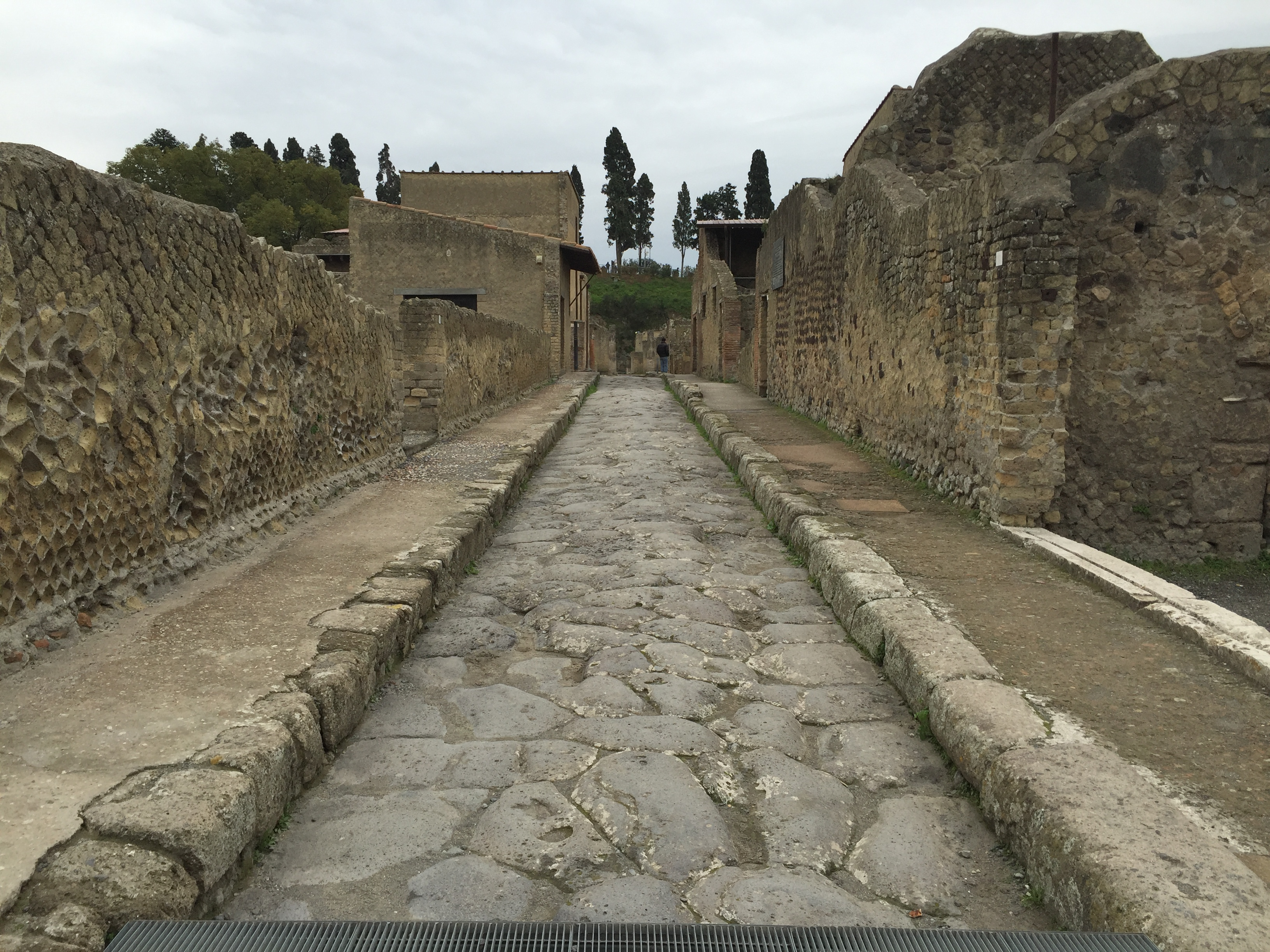
Paved street in Herculaneum

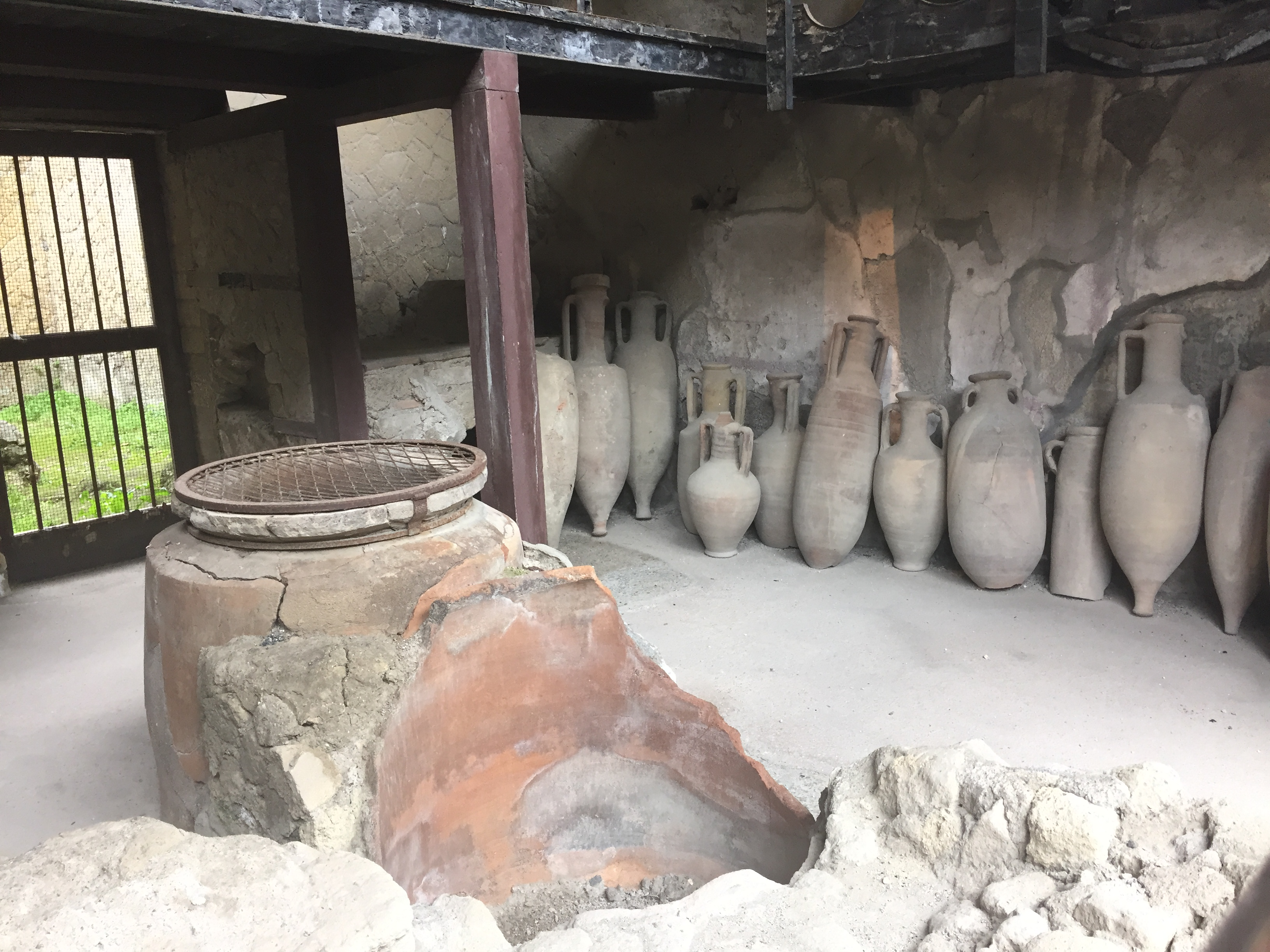
Ceramics recovered and on display

== Documentaries ==
- A 1987 National Geographic special, In the Shadow of Vesuvius, explored the sites of Pompeii and Herculaneum, interviewed archaeologists, and examined the events leading up to the eruption of Vesuvius.
- The 2002 documentary "Herculaneum. An unlucky escape" is based on research of Pier Paolo Petrone, Giuseppe Mastrolorenzo and Mario Pagano. Co-production of DocLab Rome, Discovery Channel USA, France 3 – Taxi Brousse, Spiegel TV, Mediatred, 52'.
- A 2004 documentary "Pompeii and the 79 AD eruption". TBS Channel Tokyo Broadcasting System, 120'.
- An hour-long drama produced for the BBC entitled Pompeii: The Last Day portrays several characters (with historically attested names but fictional stories) living in Pompeii, Herculaneum and around the Bay of Naples, and their last hours, including a fuller and his wife, two gladiators, and Pliny the Elder. It also portrays the facts of the eruption.
- Pompeii Live, Channel 5, 28 June 2006, 8 pm, live archaeological dig at Pompeii and Herculaneum.
- Marcellino de Baggis' 2007 documentary "Herculaneum: Diaries of Darkness and Light", Onionskin productions.
- The 2007 documentary "Troja ist überall: Auferstehung am Vesuv", Spiegel TV, 43'29.
- "Secrets of the Dead: Herculaneum Uncovered" is a PBS show covering the archaeological discoveries at Herculaneum.
- "Out of the Ashes: Recovering the Lost Library of Herculaneum" is a KBYU-TV documentary that traces the history of the Herculaneum papyri from the time of the eruption to their discovery in 1752 to modern developments that impact their study.
- "The Other Pompeii: Life and Death in Herculaneum" is a documentary presented by Andrew Wallace-Hadrill, director of Herculaneum Conservation Project.
- "Pompeii: The Mystery of the People Frozen in Time" is a 2013 BBC One drama documentary presented by Margaret Mountford.
- "Pompeii: The New Revelations" was broadcast on UK TV channel 5 in 2021.
- "Unearthed: Vesuvius' Secret Victim." Documents the city of Herculaneum and the lives of its people. It revealed that over 1,000 people of Herculaneum's 5,000 citizens had survived the eruption and were resettled in Naples and Cumae.

== See also ==
- Pompeii – Ancient city near modern Naples, Italy
- List of Roman sites
- Villa of the Papyri – Ancient Roman villa in Herculanum/Ercolano (from which many important bronze sculptures were excavated

== Resources ==
- Pliny the Younger's letters on the catastrophic eruption of Mt. Vesuvius in 79 A.D. to the Roman historian Tacitus from University of Arizona: Pliny the Younger, Letters 6.16 and 6.20 to Cornelius Tacitus and in Project Gutenberg: Letter LXV – To Tacitus, Letter LXVI – To Cornelius Tacitus
