= Marcus Nonius Balbus =

Ancient Roman public figure

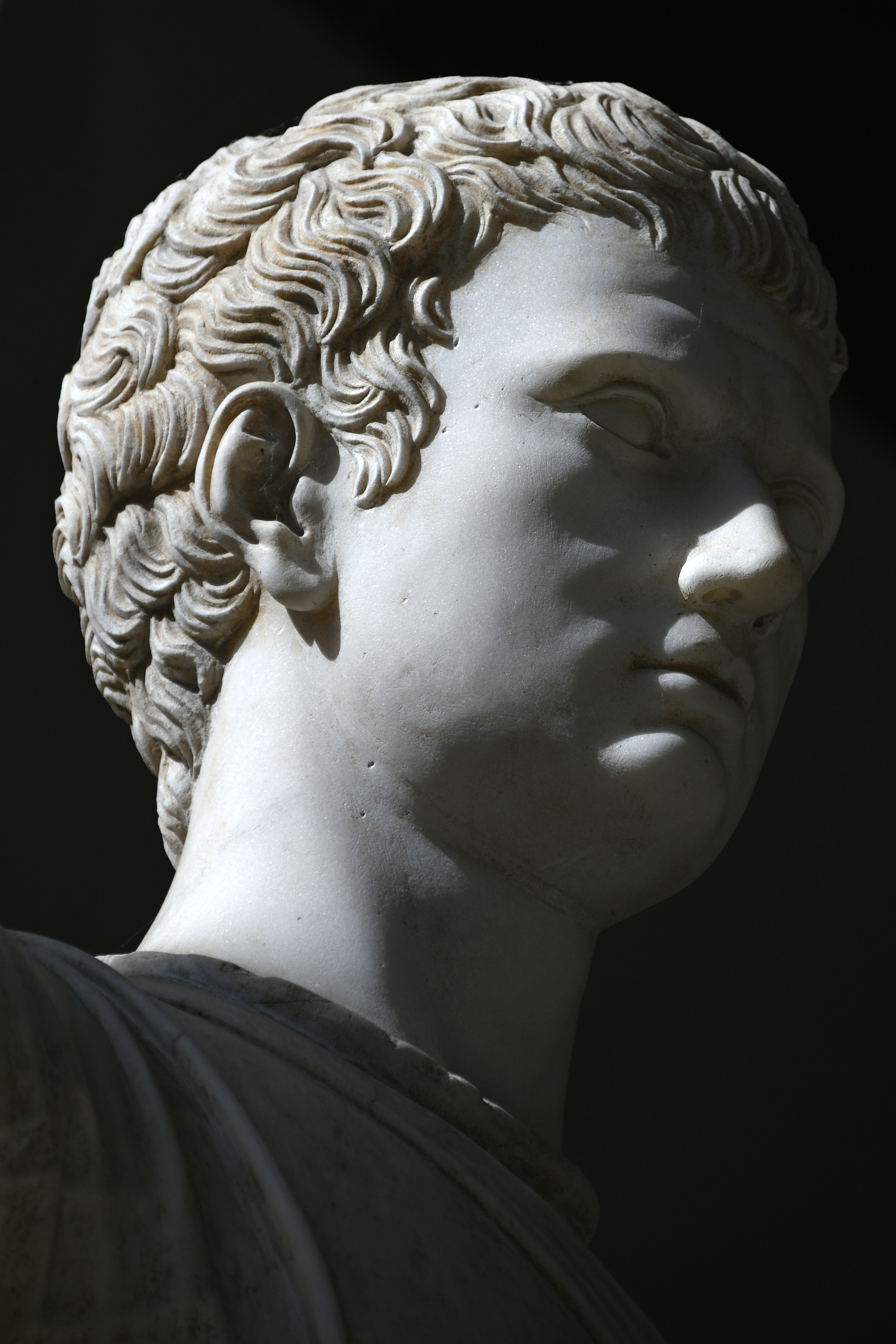
A sculpture of Marcus Nonius Balbus, depicted as a young man, excavated from the ruins of Herculaneum

Marcus Nonius Balbus the Younger was a Roman official who lived in the first century BCE, during the time of Augustus. He was a prominent public figure in the ancient Campanian town of Herculaneum, where he sponsored public infrastructure, and in whose ruins numerous statues and at least eleven inscriptions honouring him have been found.

== Origins and career ==
Marcus Nonius and his family, the Balbi – a branch of the plebeian gens Nonia – were from the town of Nucera, and therefore a part of the Roman tribe Menenia. He was the son of a father of the same name, and a mother named Viciria Archais, daughter of Aulus, from Rusellae in Etruria. Balbus the younger was the first member of his family to rise from equestrian to senatorial class.

In 32 BCE, at a time when the political rivalry in the Roman Republic between Mark Antony and Octavian Caesar of the Second Triumvirate was intensifying, Balbus held the office of tribune of the people. In this capacity, he intervened to prevent the consul Gaius Sosius – a partisan of Antony – from introducing political measures against Octavian. As Octavian's ally, Balbus would go on to hold the office of praetor, probably in 30 BCE. While still a young man, Balbus also served as proconsular governor of Roman-ruled Crete some time in the early or middle 20s BCE.

== Public honours in Herculaneum ==
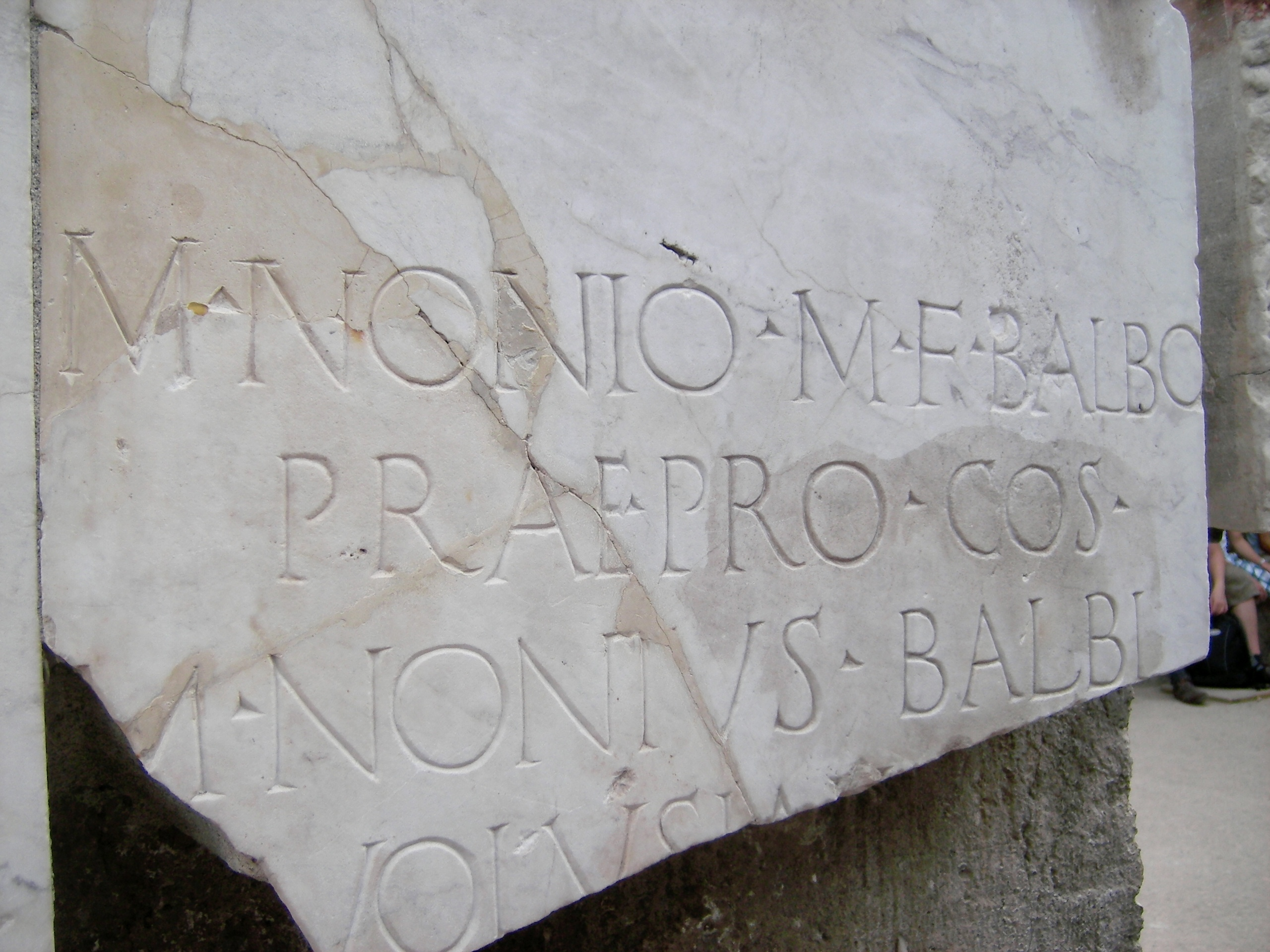
An inscription bearing the name and titles of Marcus Nonius Balbus, excavated from the ruins of Herculaneum.

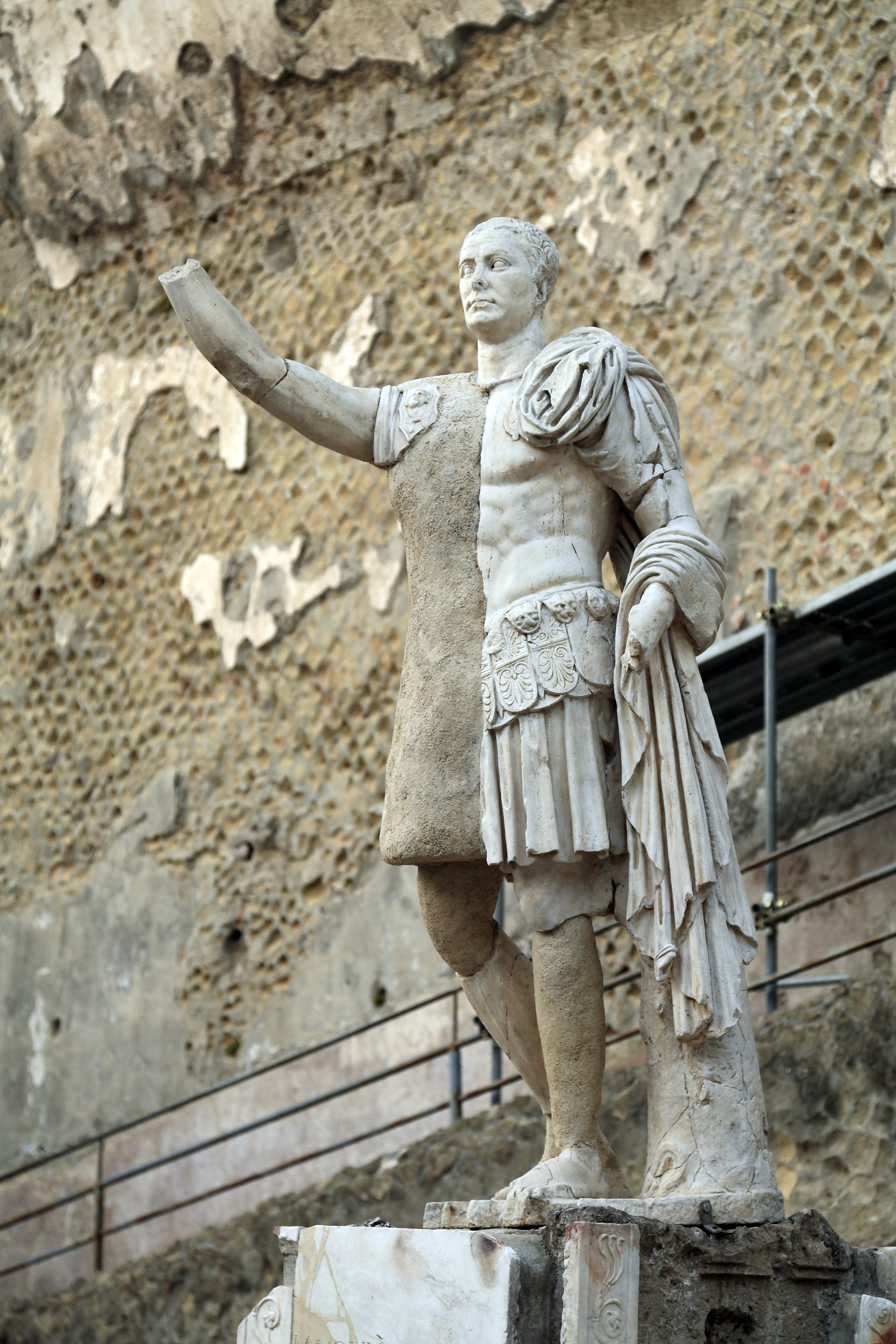
A statue depicting Marcus Nonius Balbus, adjacent to the funerary altar honouring him, standing in the ruins of Herculaneum.

At some point, Balbus chose Herculaneum as his residence and became a major public figure there. The numerous statues of Balbus erected in Herculaneum and the many inscriptions mentioning him suggest he had the role of a benefactor and patron to the town. A basilica in the town was donated by Balbus and came to be called the Basilica Noniana, in which a statue gallery of his family was displayed, with inscriptions stating the sculptures were paid for or dedicated by the Herculaneum town council. Another inscription found in Herculaneum states that Balbus "constructed the basilica, gates, wall at his own expense".

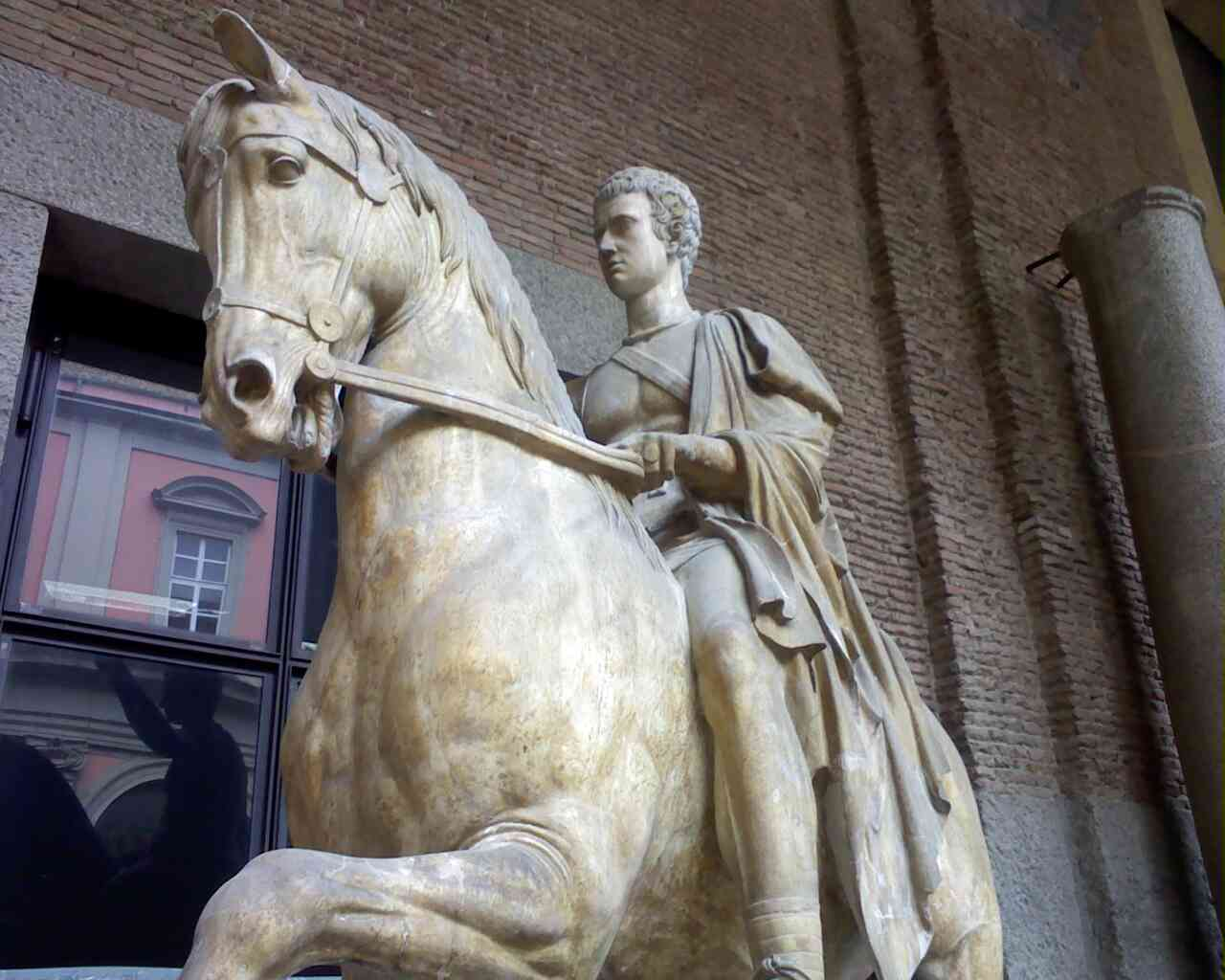
An equestrian statue of Marcus Nonius Balbus depicted as a young man, excavated from the ruins of Herculaneum.

Several equestrian statues of Balbus have been found. According to inscriptions, one of these was donated by "the people of Herculaneum"; another by the people of his former hometown, "the Nucerians his fellow townsfolk". Other statues and inscriptions state they were donated by the peoples of the Cretan towns of Cnossus and Gortyn, and of the Cretan community as a whole, over which he once ruled over as proconsul, and which call Balbus their patron.

An extraordinary funerary altar was set up on a sea-side terrace in Herculaneum to honour Balbus after his death, with an inscription by the town council declaring several public honours to be given to Balbus posthumously:

Seeing as Marcus Ofillius Celer, duumvir for the second time, made the statement that it was conducive to the town’s dignity to act in response to the public service of Marcus Nonius Balbus, they decreed on this matter as follows: Marcus Nonius Balbus, for as long as he lived here, displayed a father’s spirit together with the utmost generosity to individuals and everyone alike. Therefore it pleases the town councillors that an equestrian statue be set up to him in the most frequented place out of public funds and that it be inscribed: ‘To Marcus Nonius Balbus, son of Marcus, of the Menenian voting-tribe, praetor, proconsul, patron. The whole governing body of the people of Herculaneum (set this up) on account of his public service’; and also in the same place, where his ashes have been gathered together, that a marble altar be made and set up and publicly inscribed: ‘To Marcus Nonius Balbus, son of Marcus’; and that a procession proceed from this place at the festival of the dead, and that one day be added in his honour to the athletic games, which had usually occurred, and that when shows are performed in the theatre, his seat be placed there. They decreed.

Balbus's descendants and freedmen were also prominently mentioned in public inscriptions.

== Personal life ==
At some point he married Volasennia Tertia, daughter of Gaius Volasenna, an Etruscan woman thought to be from a senatorial family. They seem to have had a son, and two to five daughters.
