= Conservation issues of Pompeii and Herculaneum =

Aspect of archaeology in Pompeii and Herculaneum

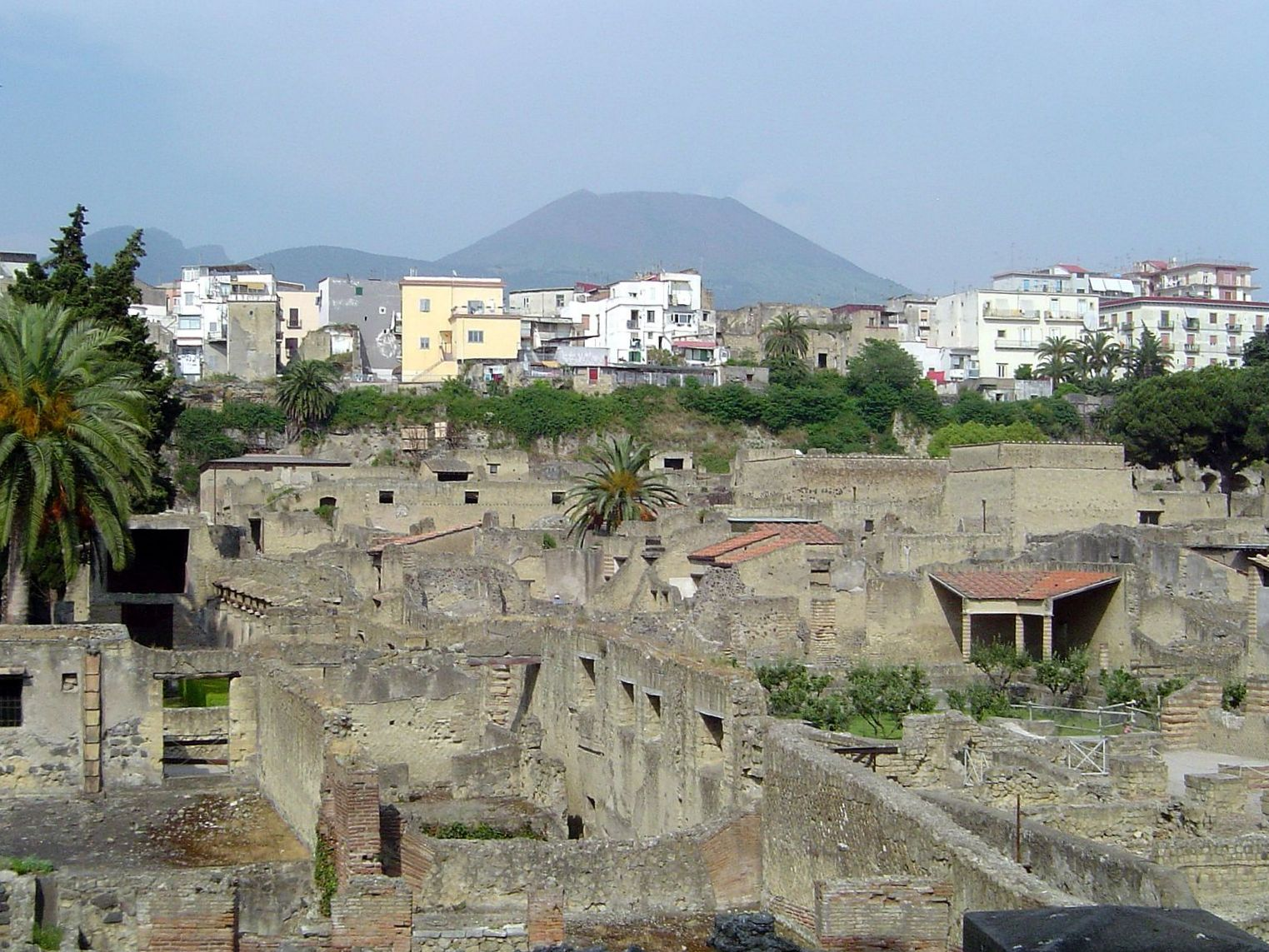
Ancient Herculaneum (bottom), modern Ercolano (center), and Vesuvius (top)

Pompeii and Herculaneum were once thriving towns, 2,000 years ago, in the Bay of Naples. Both cities have rich histories influenced by Greeks, Oscans, Etruscans, Samnites and finally the Romans. They are most renowned for their destruction: both were buried in the AD 79 eruption of Mount Vesuvius. For over 1,500 years, these cities were left in remarkable states of preservation underneath volcanic ash, mud and rubble. The eruption obliterated the towns but in doing so, was the cause of their longevity and survival over the centuries.

For both cities, however, excavation has brought with it deterioration. Both natural forces and human activity (whether accidental or deliberate) have played their part in the slow disintegration of the sites. Many agents of deterioration play a role in these conservation issues. Paintings being exposed to light, buildings being worn away by natural forces and water damage due to inappropriate excavation and reconstruction methods, as well as theft and vandalism all play a part in the slow decline of the sites' integrity. As stated by Henri de Saint-Blanquat:

The city's second existence began with its gradual rediscovery in the 18th century. But just when Pompeii was being rediscovered, it began to die its second death. Not only because the early excavations, carried out over two hundred years ago and again in the 19th century, often turned out to be more of a massacre — what fun to carry off statues and fling around inscribed bronze plaques! — but also because all the remains preserved by the catastrophic explosion, were now exposed to the extremes of the weather, to vegetation and to man... Pompeii suffers from pollution, the worst forms of damage are of human origin.

— Henri de Saint-Blanquat, Science et Avenir No. 469, March 1986

The ancient city was included in the 1996 World Monuments Watch by the World Monuments Fund, and again in 1998 and in 2000. In 1996, the organization claimed that Pompeii "desperately need[ed] repair" and called for the drafting of a general plan of restoration and interpretation. In order to effectively establish widespread conservation efforts across both sites, the Packard Humanities Institute in collaboration with a "Soprintendenza," a branch of the Ministry of Culture (Italy), organized private-public partnership to subsidize and contract restorative projects.

== Problems of Conservation ==
While the excavation of the cities has led to a wealth of information on the two towns and on Roman life in general, it has also allowed the sites to be exposed to common agents of deterioration. Some of the damage is inevitable, however, much of it can be mitigated through conservative and restorative intervention. Unfortunately, funding is in such a state that not everything can be saved. An estimated US$335 million is needed to carry out all the works necessary in Pompeii alone.

=== Weathering and Erosion ===
Pompeii and Herculaneum have been excavated for centuries. Serious excavations began in Herculaneum by 1738 as a result of the accidental discovery of four statues at the dig site of well in 1711, and later in 1748. The statues, Hercules and the Vestal Virgins captured the imaginations of the general populace, and soon excavations with the intent to find more art had begun. Unfortunately, early excavations weren't undertaken with care, and the removal of the layer of ash, mud, and rubble that protected the artifacts and the city beneath resulted in immediate deterioration. The eruption had disrupted many of the building's foundations, while initial excavations left them unstable and vulnerable, and exposing them further to the elements exacerbated the deterioration process. Many structures, such as the town wall of Pompeii have had their structural integrity compromised. Walls have partially collapsed and much of the site is closed to visitors because of the danger it poses to them.

The artifacts found on-site are also susceptible to these agents of deterioration, mainly air, humidity, natural light, and climatic changes. In Herculaneum, the carbonized remains of objects once exposed deteriorated within days. Only when a protective agent (lampblack) was applied were they able to survive in the open. In Herculaneum, the skeletal remains of 300 humans were found along the ancient shoreline left exposed to the elements, due to a lack of funding, they are at risk of further deterioration. While some of the damage is irreparable, the issues of funding and threat mitigation have prompted conservation and restoration specialists to reexamine and enact proper protocol in order to prevent future harm to the objects and the site itself

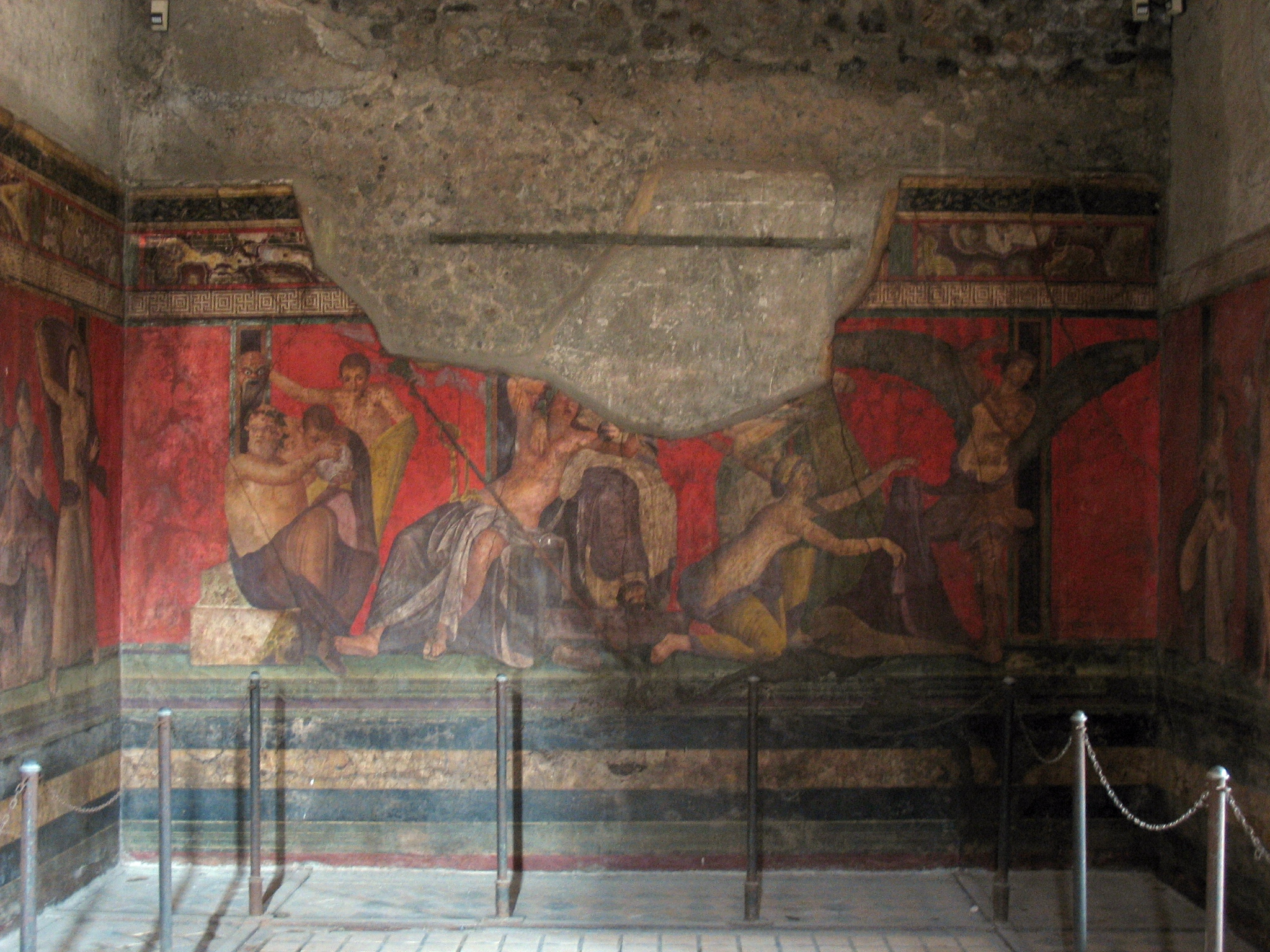
This fresco of a girl's initiation into the cult of Dionysos shows not only damage before and during the eruption, but also a distinct fade in the lustre of the paint caused from exposure after excavation. Flash photography is prohibited to inhibit further deterioration.

==== Light Exposure ====
The frescoes, sculptures, and paintings prevalent in both towns were highly preserved, retaining a large amount of detail, color, and vibrancy as a result of the thick layer of ash that covered them from the eruption. Unfortunately, on excavation, they began to fade due to exposure to air and natural light as that protective layer of ash was removed. Worse, they began to crumble as well as pull away from the walls they were adhered to. However, these issues can be resolved through simple conservation techniques: earlier organic methods of preservation proved effective, and a more modern method using aluminum and plastic has seen even better results. In addition, detailed reproductions have been made of many of the artworks, such as the Alexander Mosaic in the House of the Faun.

Not all actions taken to preserve structures and artifacts have been effective, however, and some have caused more damage. For example, perspex cases have been constructed to protect frescoes and graffiti, however, this creates a humidity trap and causes damage to the plaster.

==== Plants and Animals ====
The region of Campania in which both sites lie is very temperate and fertile, in part due to the volcanic ash, so many plants thrive even inside the archaeological site. Henri de Saint-Blanquat identifies thirty-one plants in Pompeii, which, after growing in patches of bare earth, grow outward and attack the surrounding buildings, as well as dislodging tiles and mosaics. In particular, ivy grows along the walls, making parts crumble, and the roots undermine the foundations of the buildings. Another problem the sites face is the passage of seeds in regions traversed by tourists. Their feet trample the plants; in closed-off areas, particularly those closest to unexcavated parts of the cities, and carry the seeds around the site causing growth in various areas—this can severely damage the buildings.

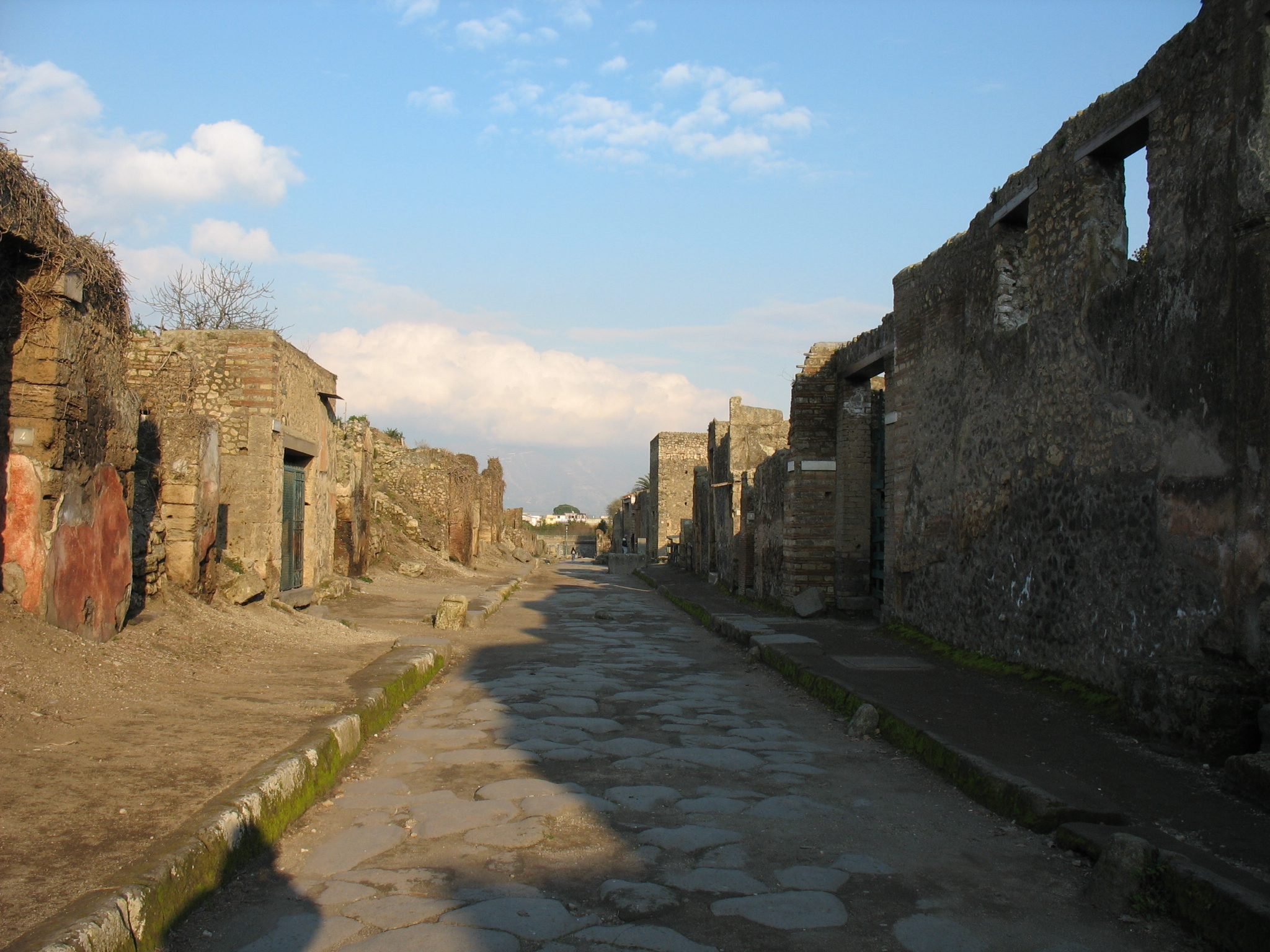
The buildings on the left show signs of decay due to the infestation of various plants, while the debris accumulating on the footpath indicates erosion of the infrastructure. The footpaths and road have also been worn down by pedestrian activity since excavation.

Feral dogs were particularly an issue in Pompeii. The dogs which occupied buildings around the Forum in the 1980s have been removed. Hundreds lived on the site, inadvertently damaging footpaths, roads and walls, as well as proving aggressive towards some tourists.

In Herculaneum, pigeons are a particular problem; the acidic nature of their feces wears away the roofs and walls of many structures. Italian law prohibits them from being shot.

=== Human Activity ===
==== Early Excavations ====
Particularly in Herculaneum, the earliest excavations revolved around collecting valuable artifacts and antiquities rather than systematic excavation. By merely digging for objects with aesthetic and commercial value, they were taken from being in situ to private collections. Thus much of the information on them was lost. Additionally, objects not considered worthy by pursuers of Antiquarianism were destroyed or damaged in the process of retrieving other items.

These valuable objects, once discovered, were also disorganized and lost all historical meaning: a collection of bronze letters fixed initially on a wall in Herculaneum, once removed by the Bourbon kings, were taken out of order without recording the original placement or meaning. Visitors were invited to re-arrange them to form their own messages. A similar usage was made of bones: they would often be arranged together as composites of bones of several individuals, even combining those of children with adults and giving some two left feet. These would then be displayed for dramatic effect. Some of these remain today, but there is little hope of reforming the original skeletons or using them to discover information on Pompeii or Herculaneum's inhabitants.

==== Gallery of Luigi Bazzani's Watercolors of Pompeii when first excavated ====
(See more on Wikimedia Commons)

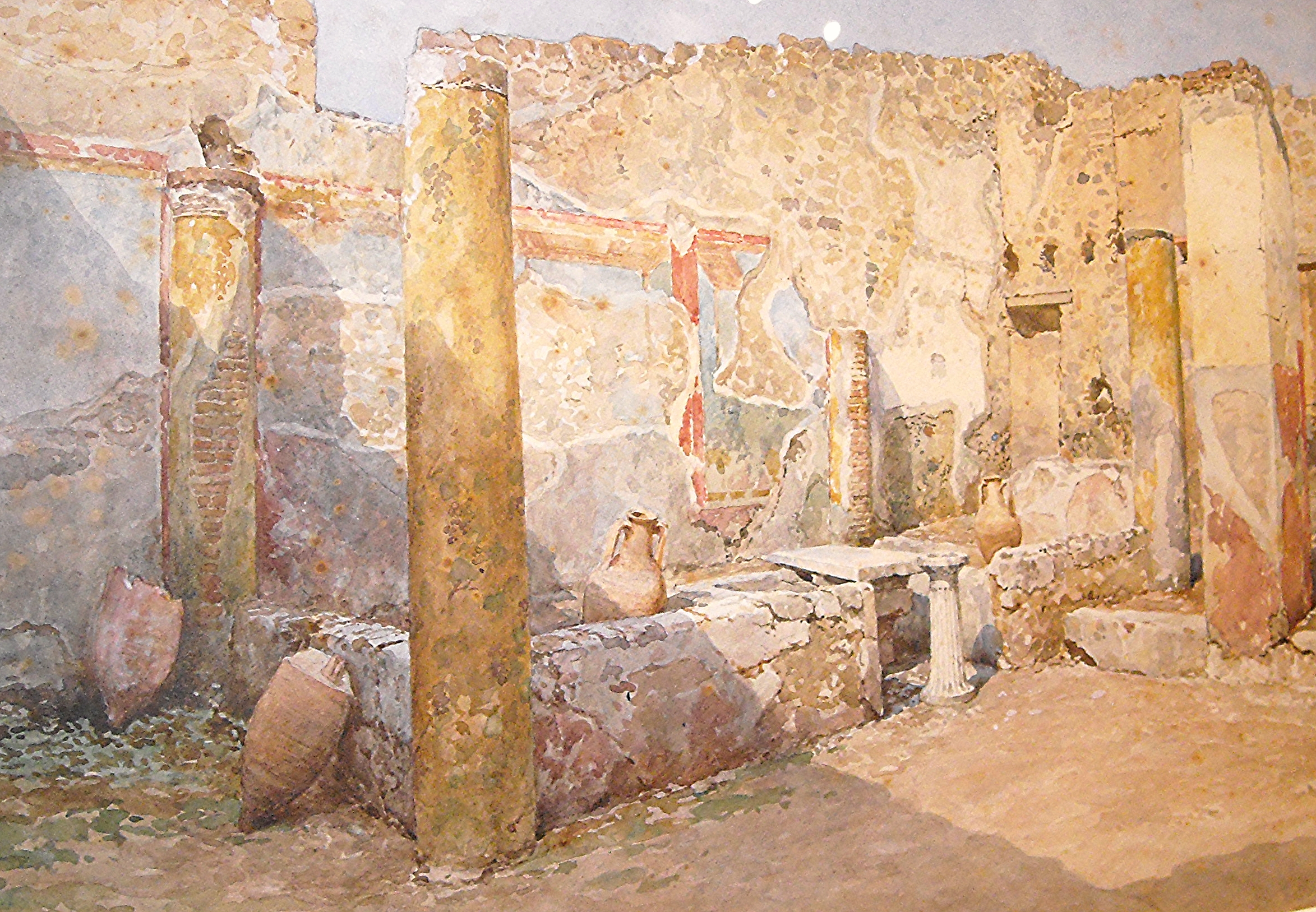
Summer Triclinium of House V, 2, 15, 1914

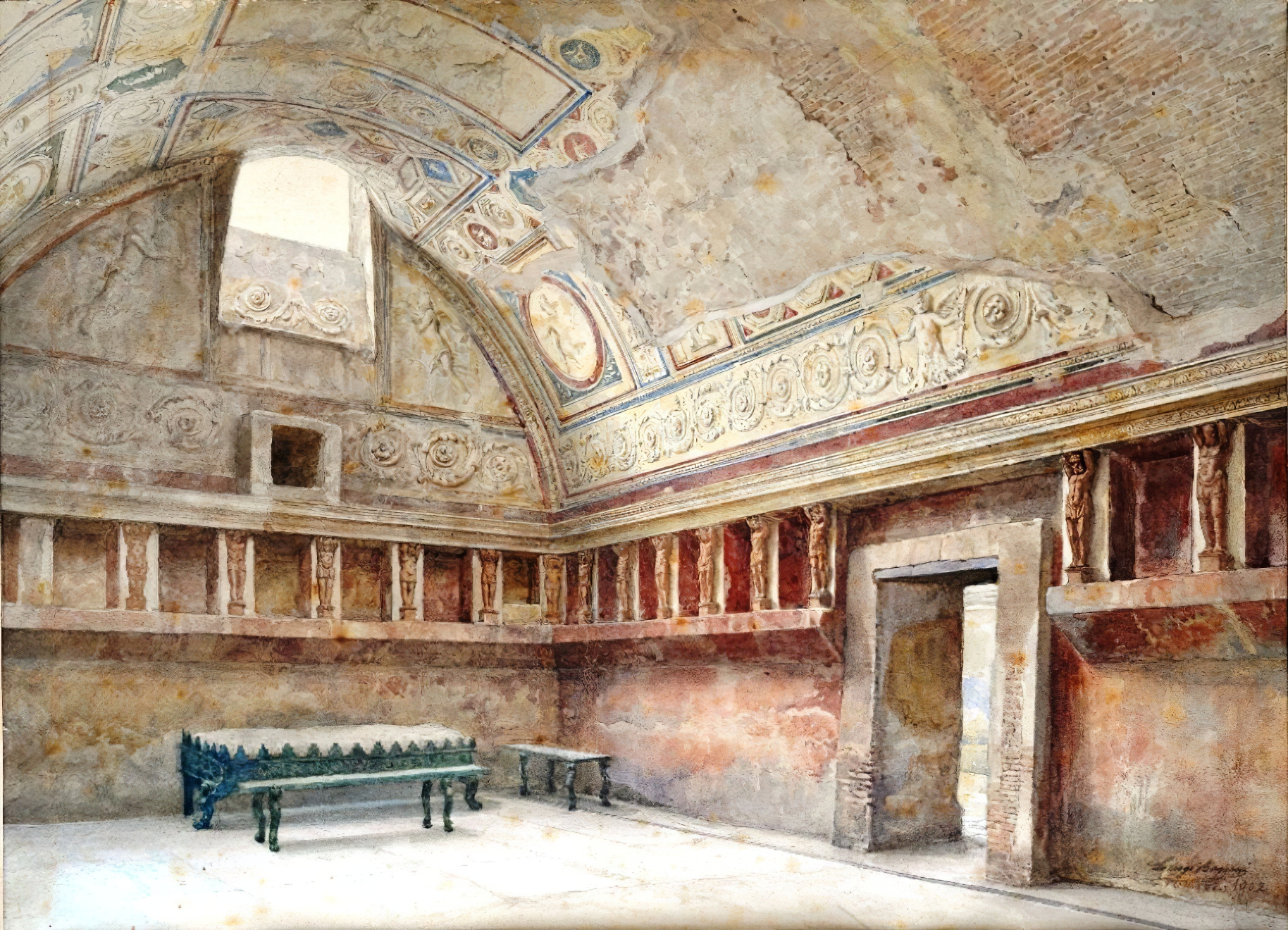
Pompeii Bath

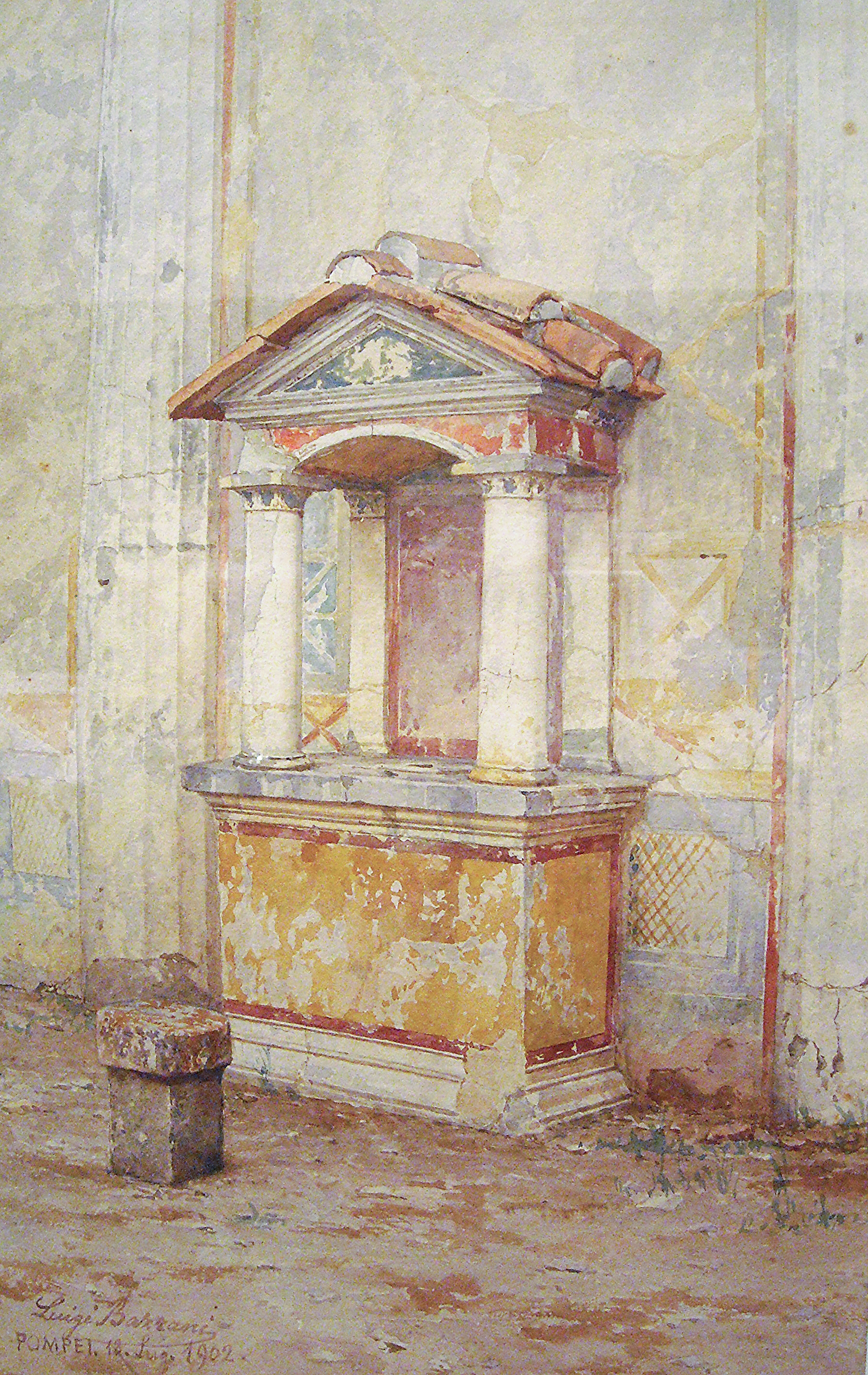
Lararium of the House of Dioscuri, 1902

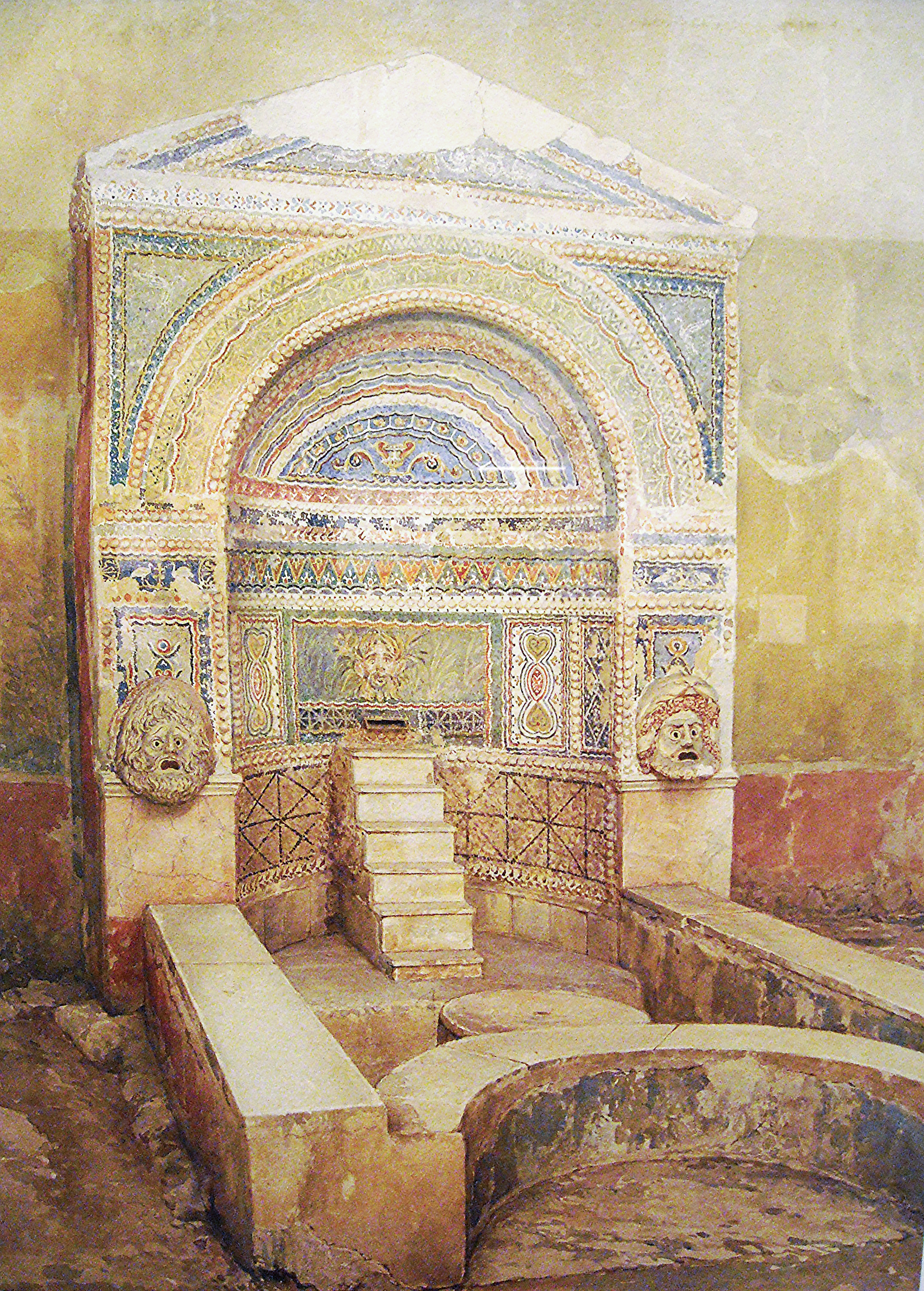
House of the Great Fountain

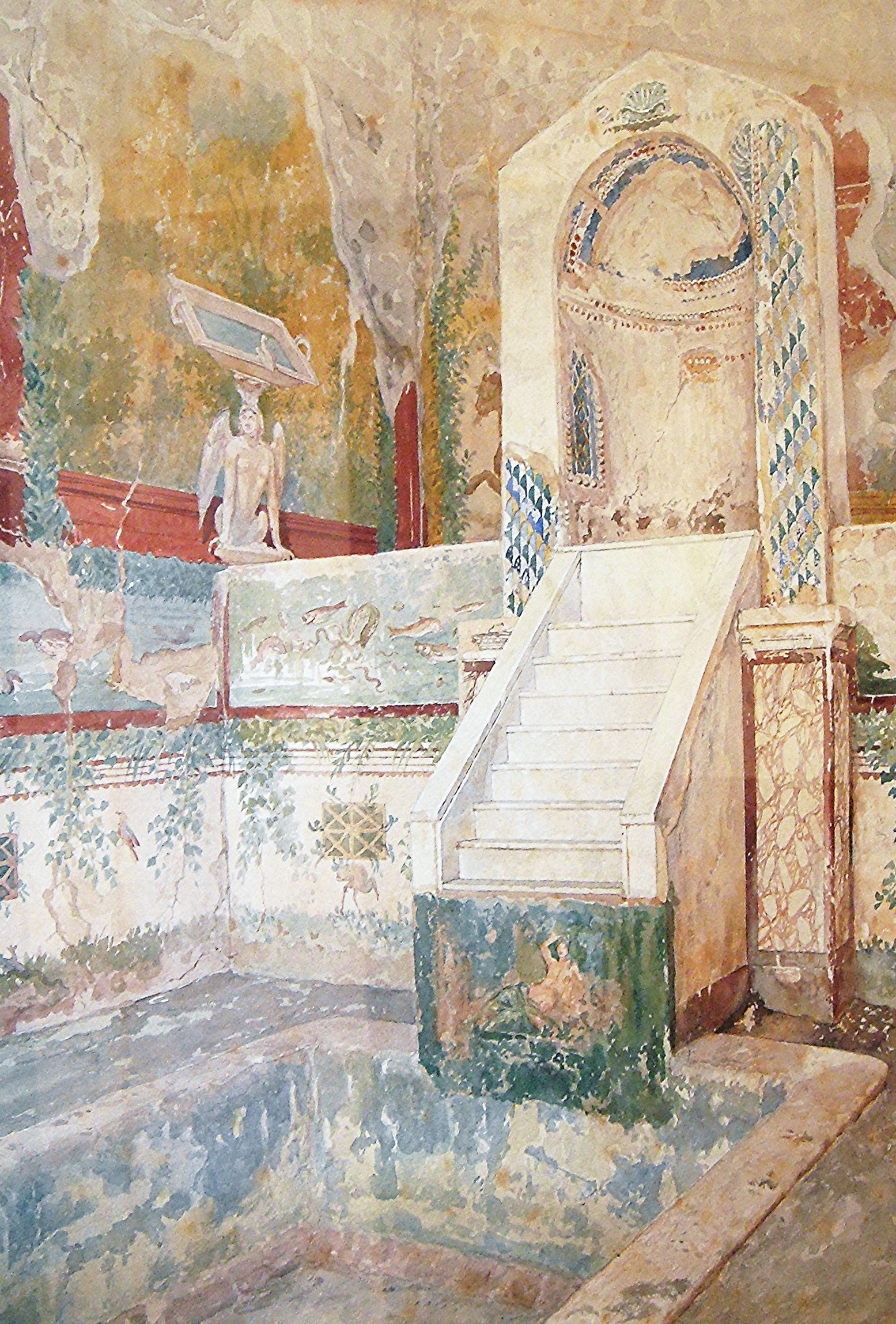
Atrium of the House of the Centenary, 1901

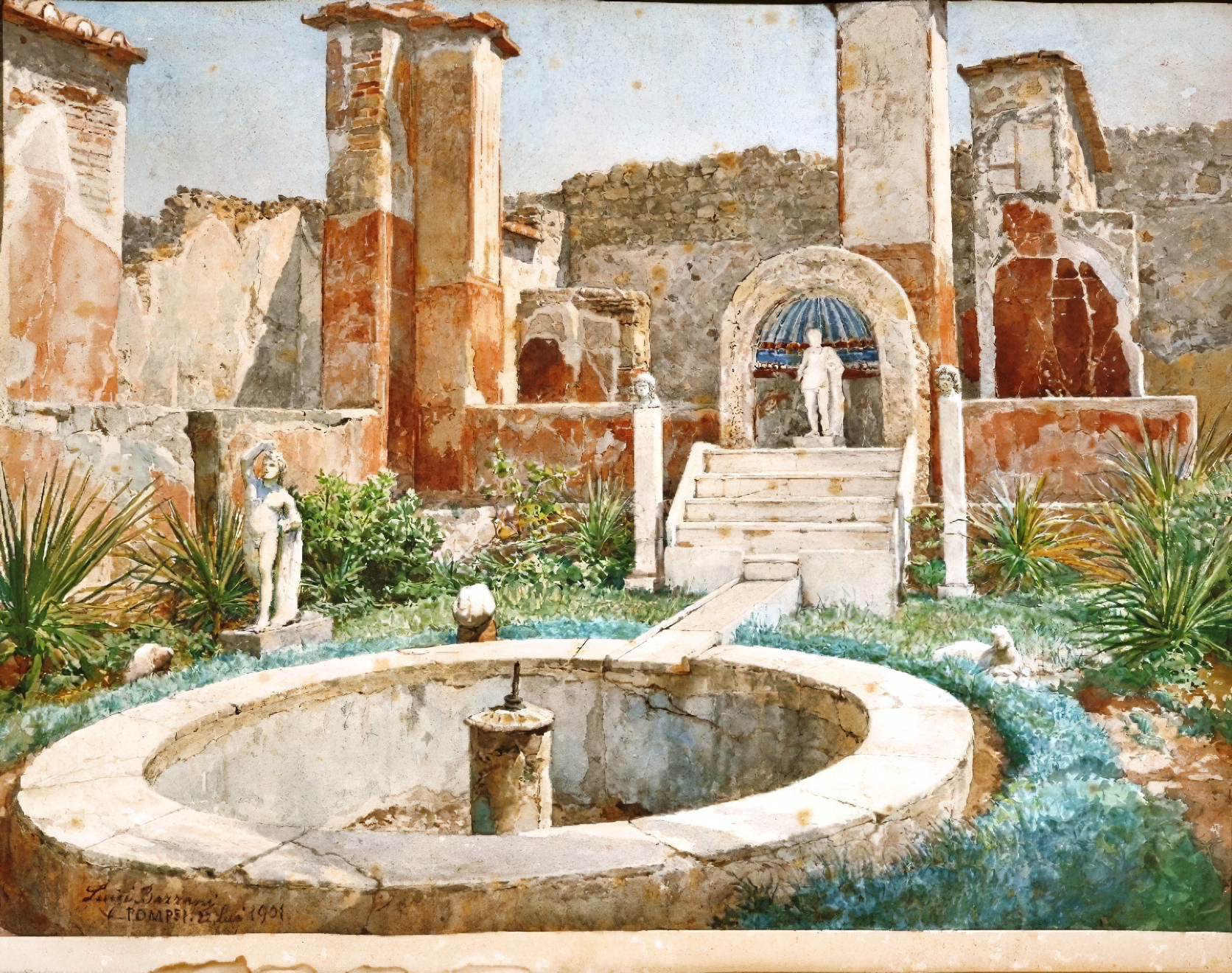
Peristyle with fountain in the House of Marcus Lucretius

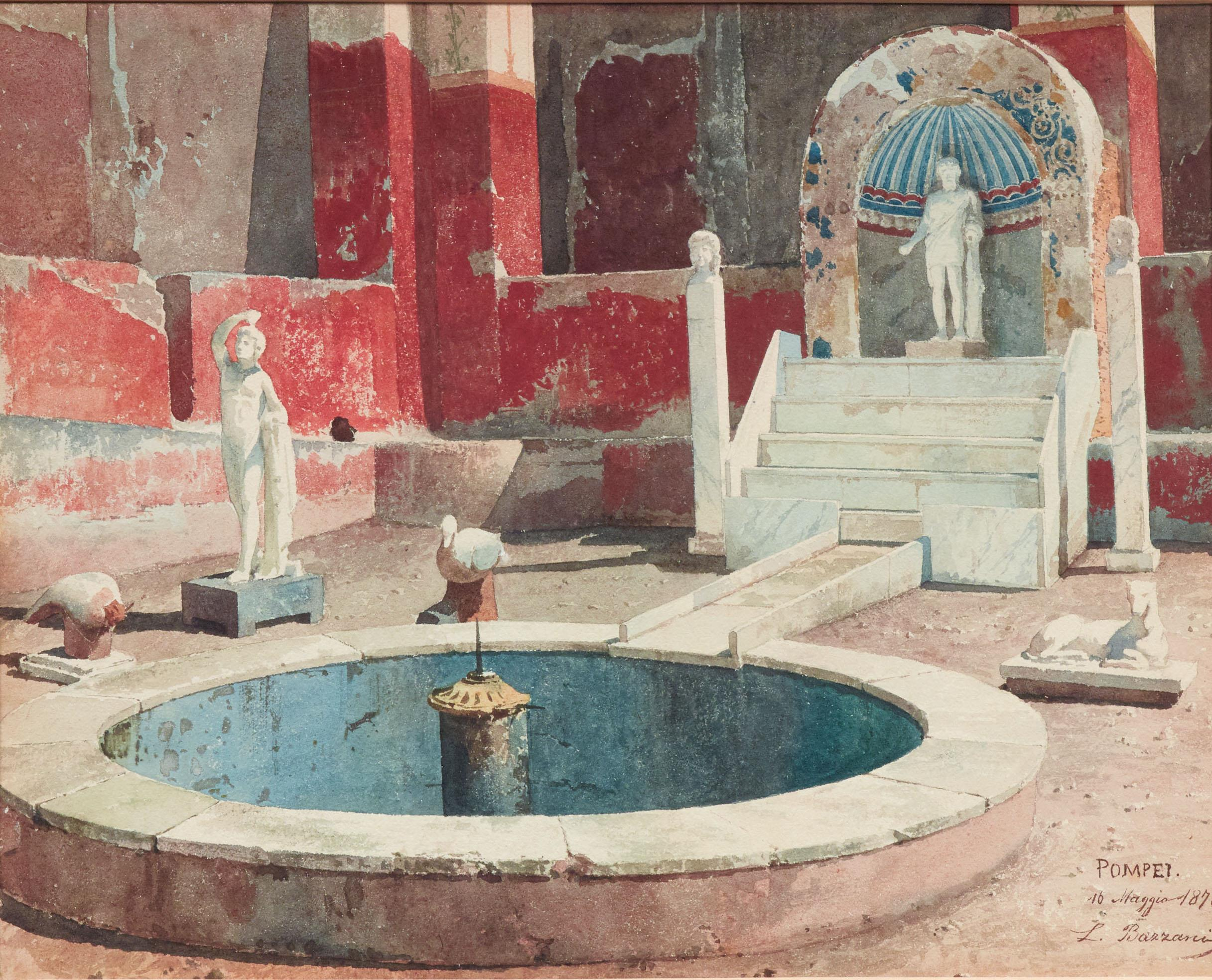
Peristyle with fountain in the House of Marcus Lucretius (Detail)

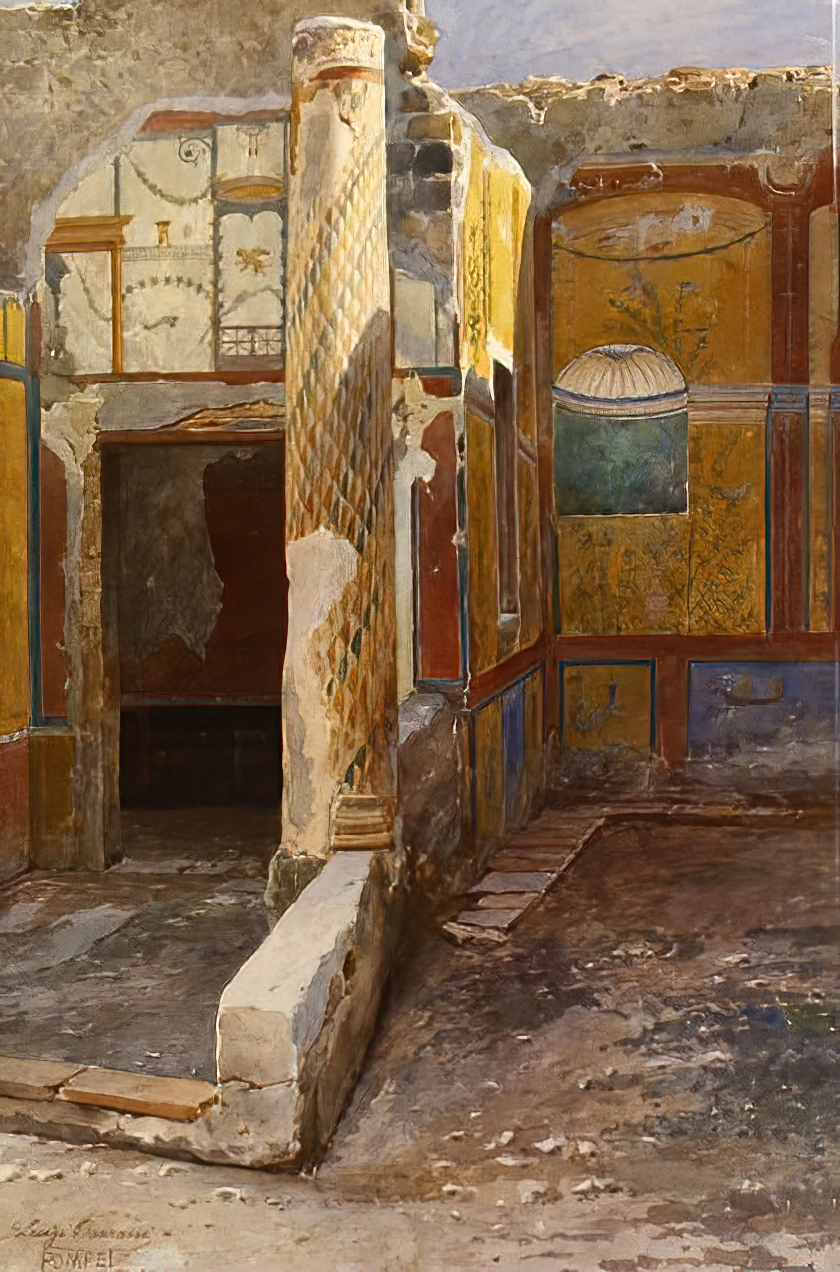
Pompeii Interior

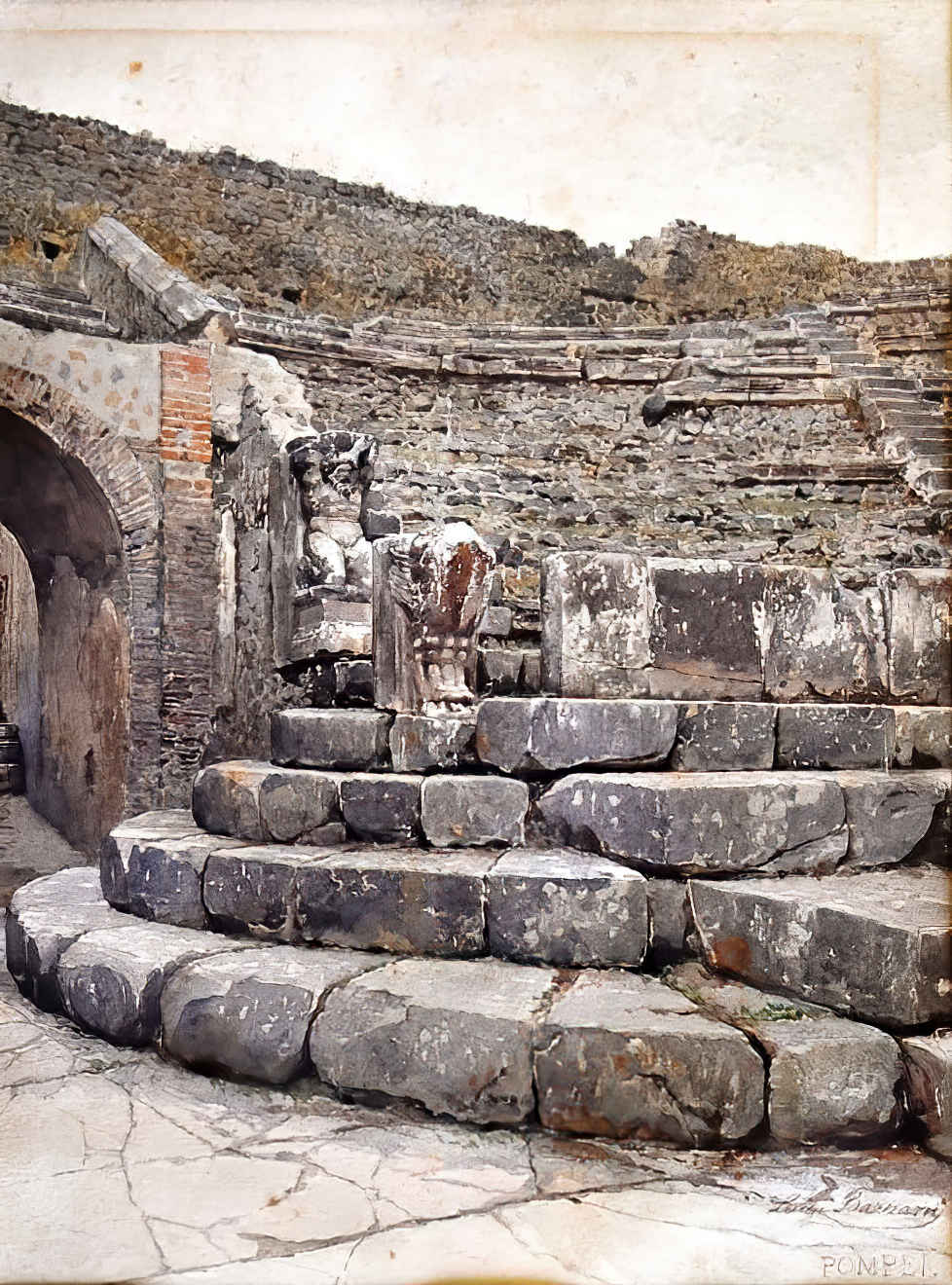
Pompeii theater

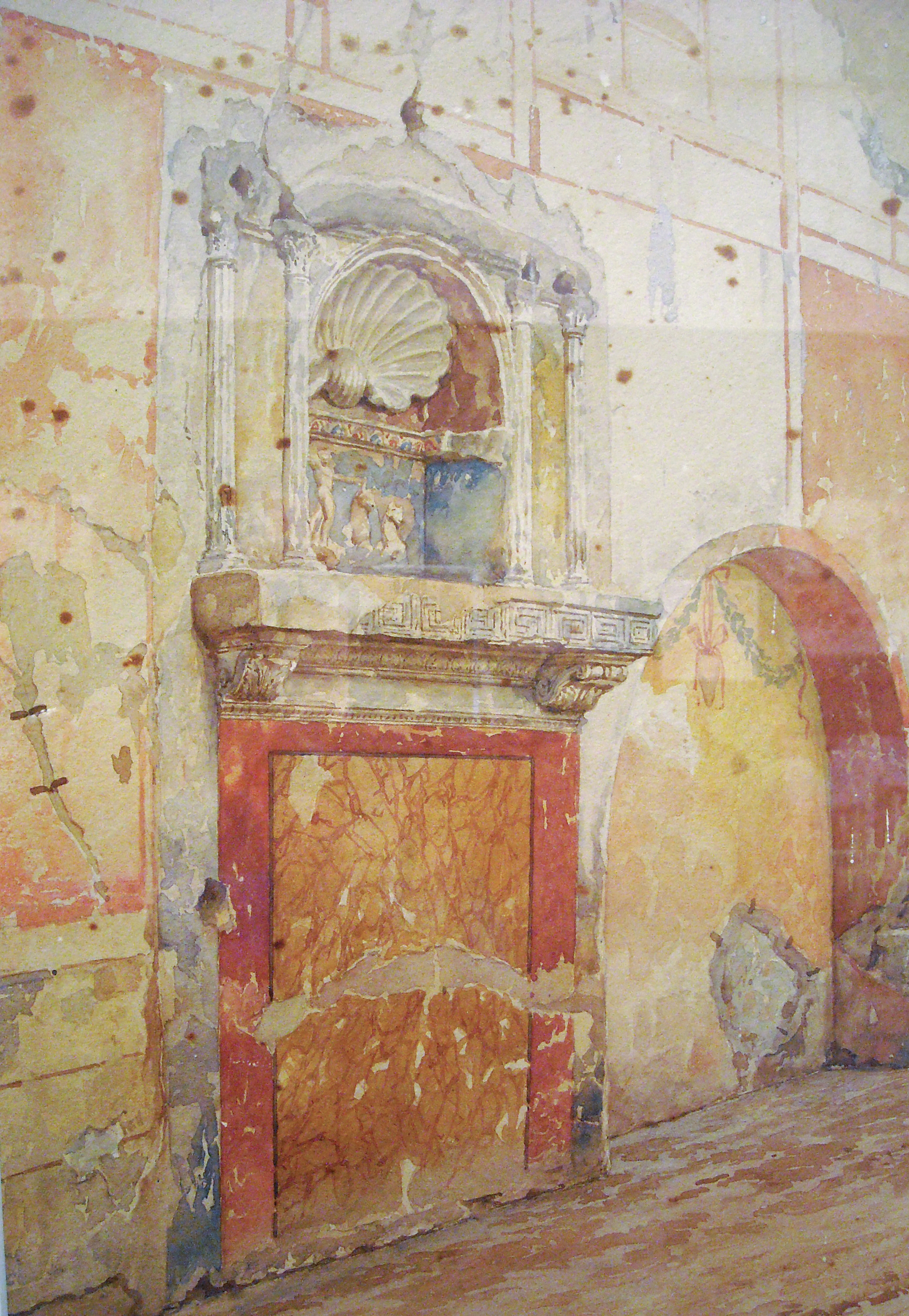
Lararium of the House IX,1,7, Pompeii, 1903

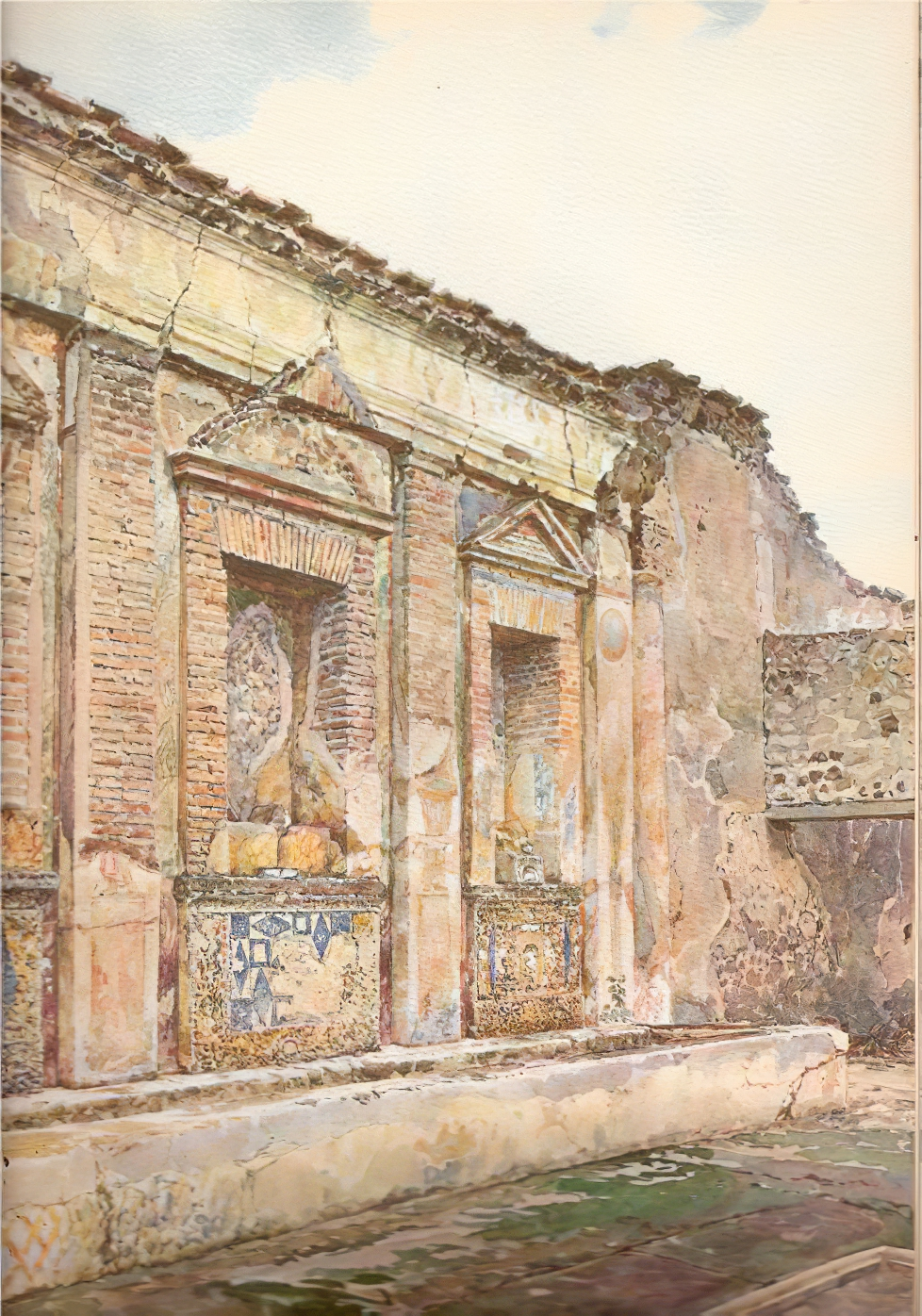
Nymphaeum at the House of the Bull, 1901

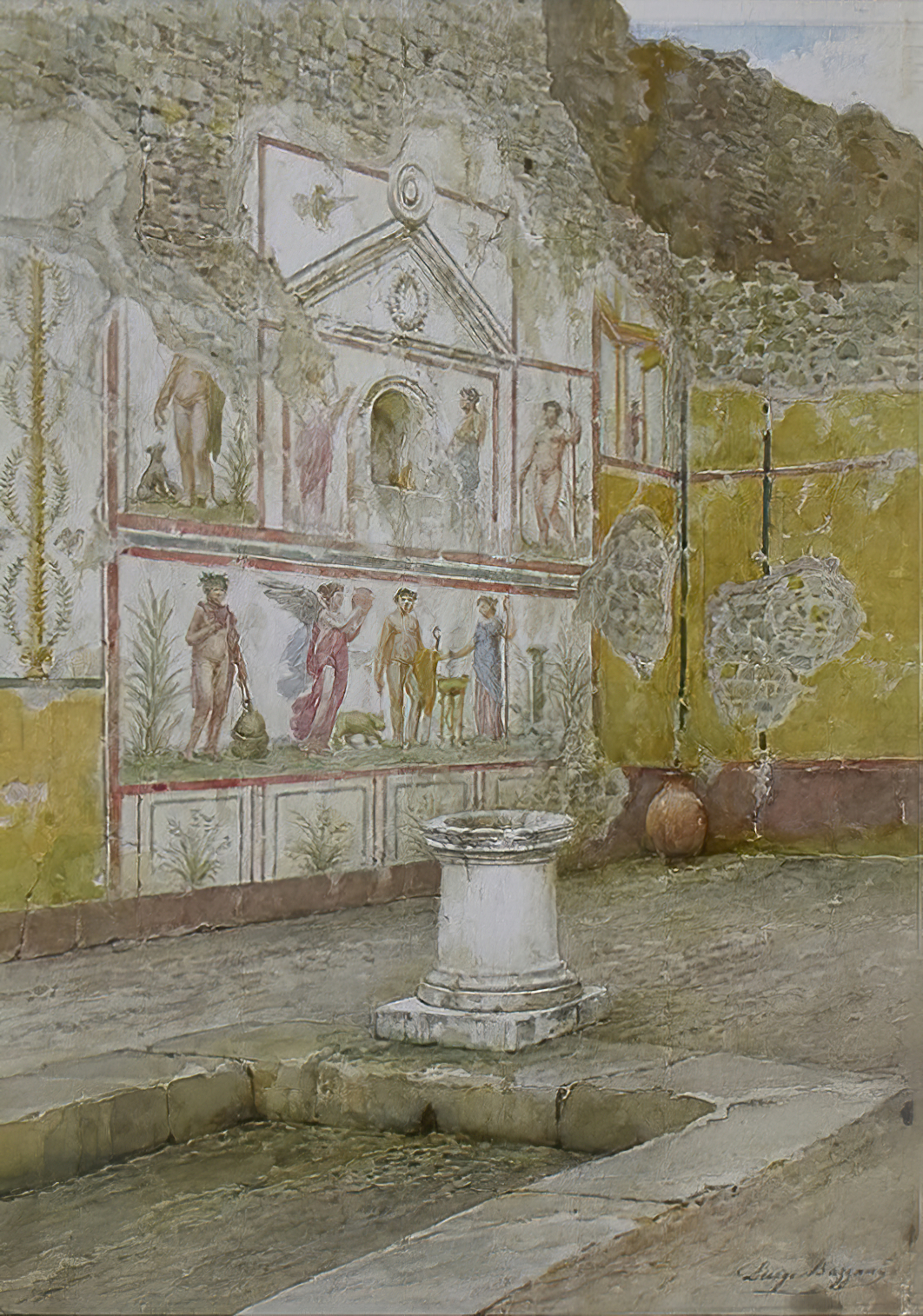
Atrium of the House of the Mariner

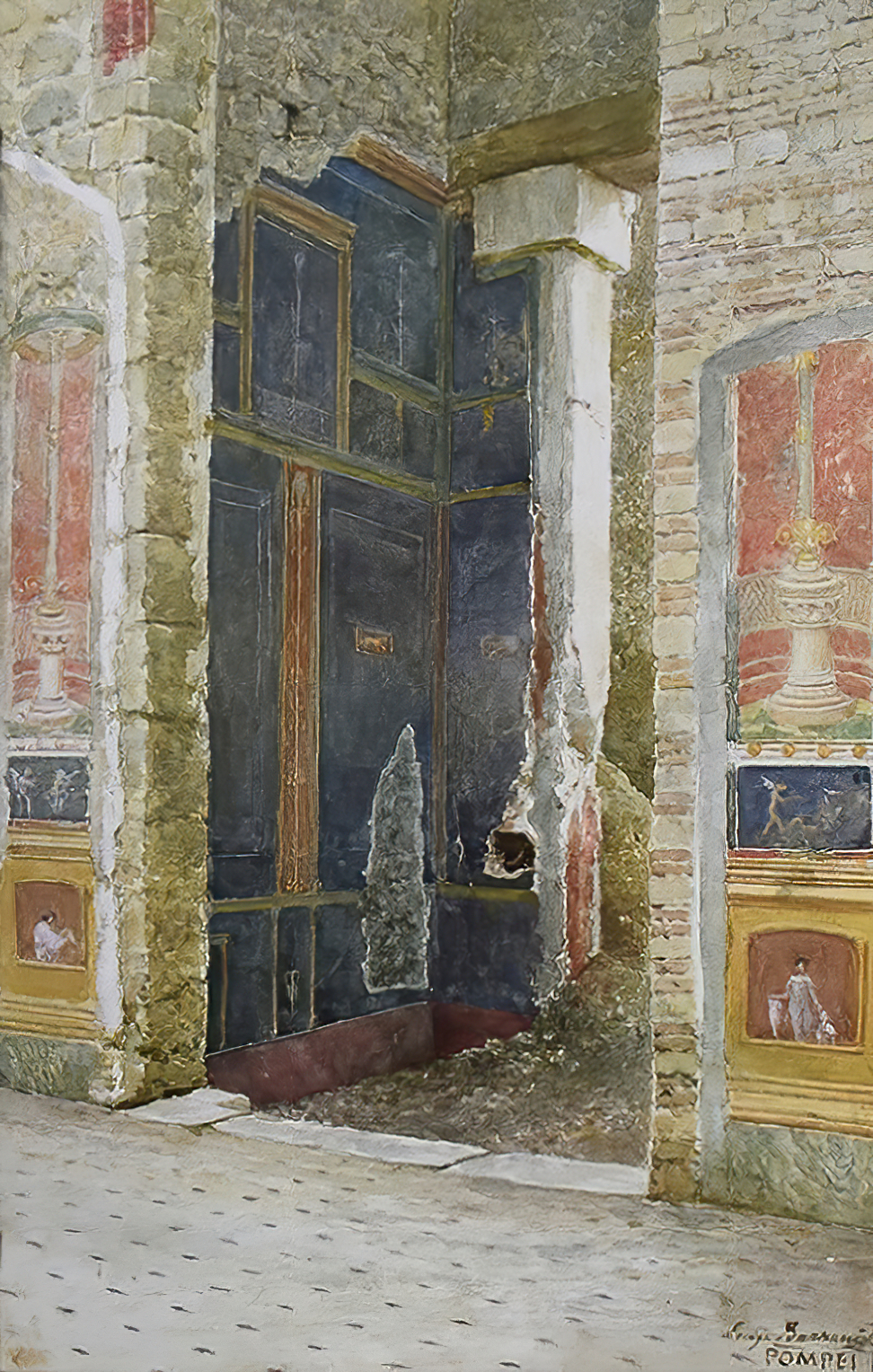
House of the Vetti

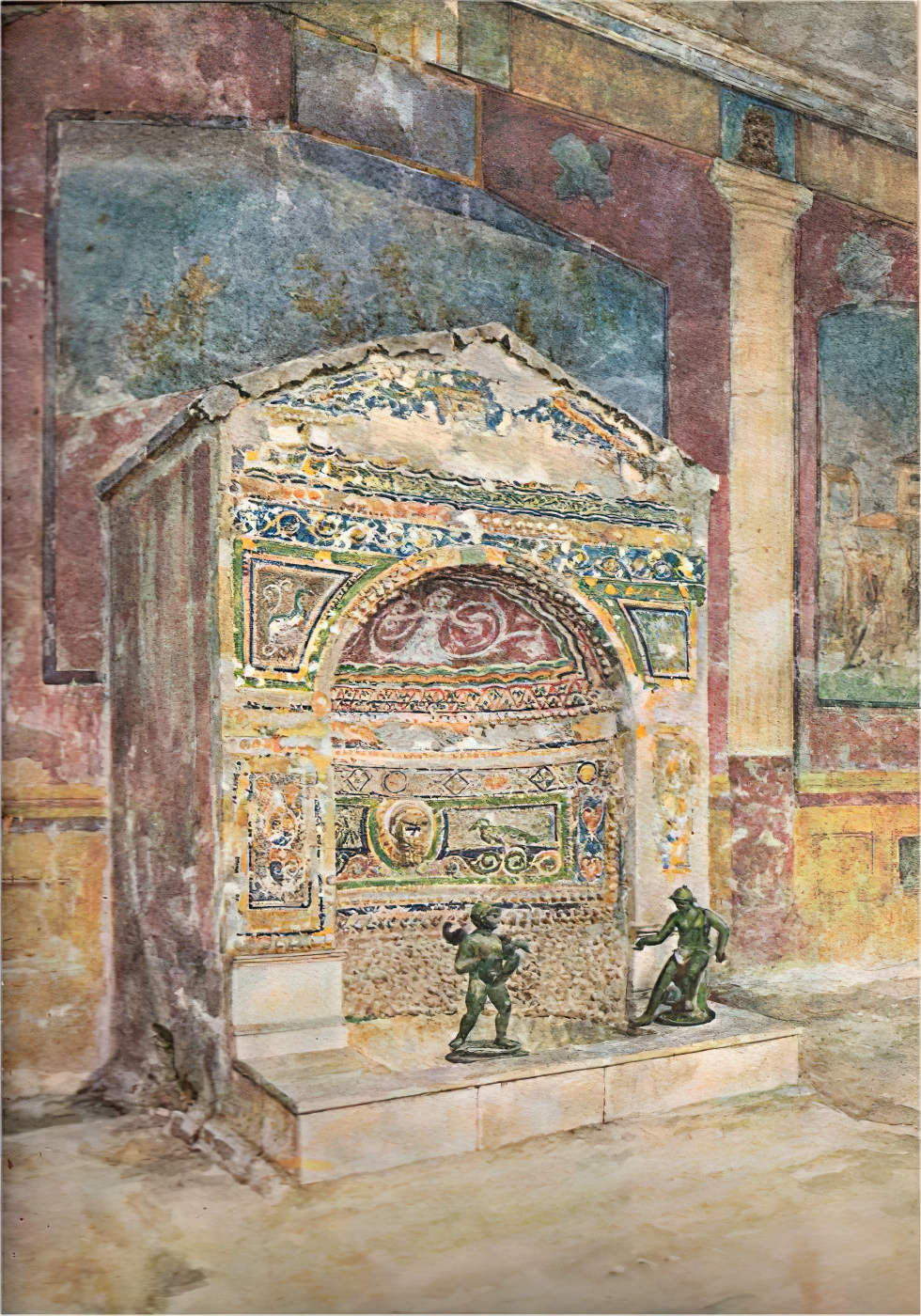
House of the Small Fountain

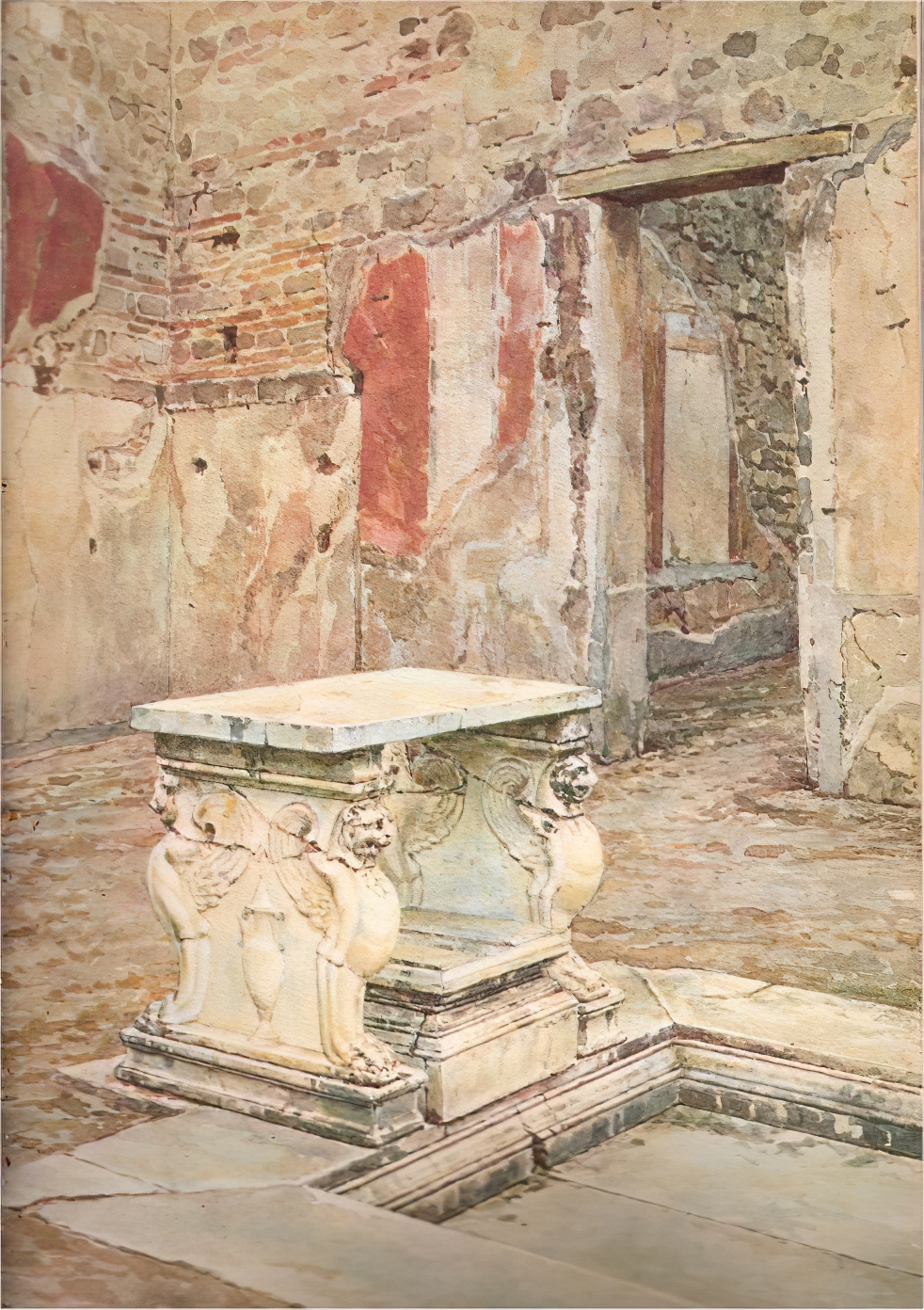
House with impluvium and marble table

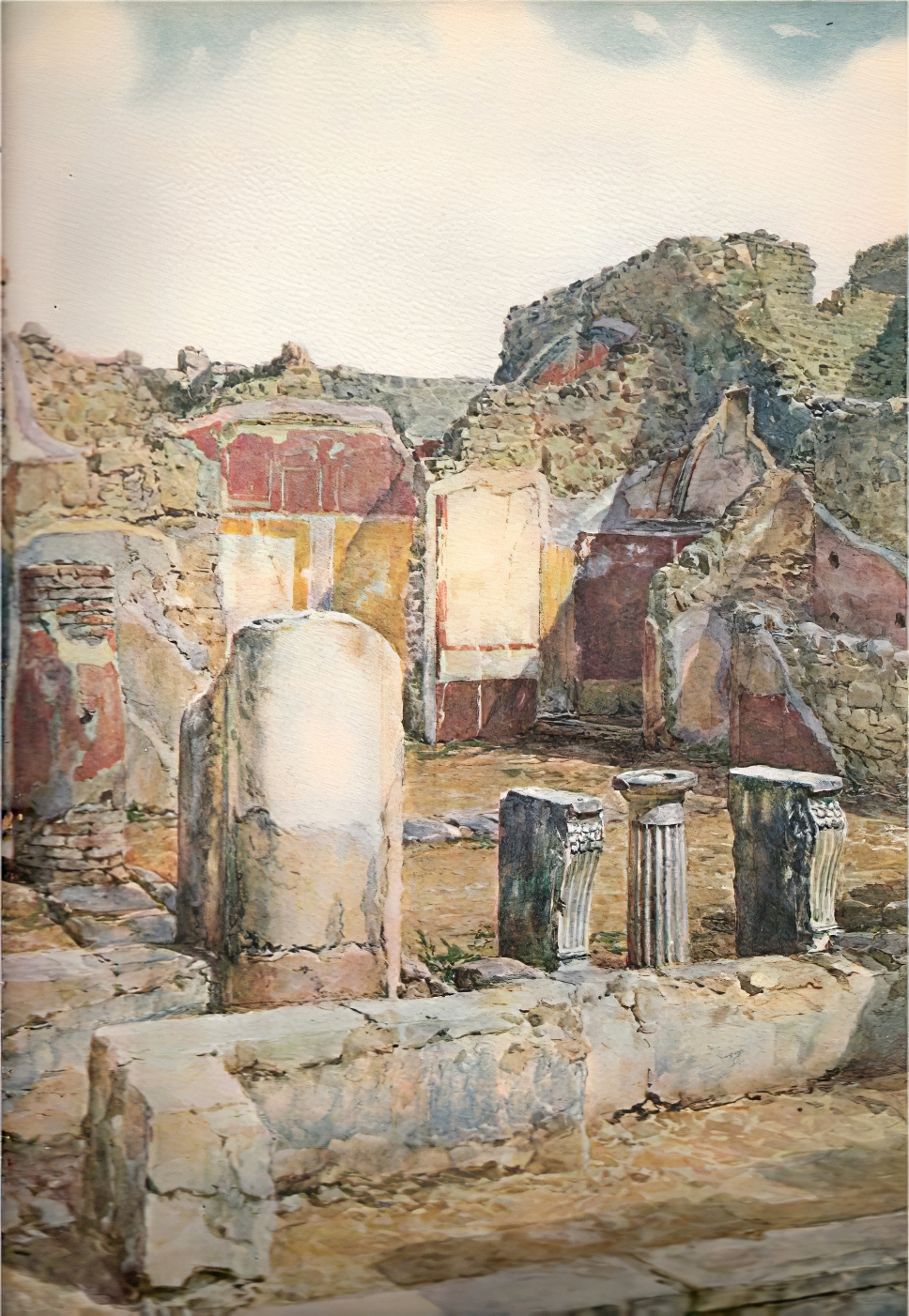
Insula in Region IX, V, 18

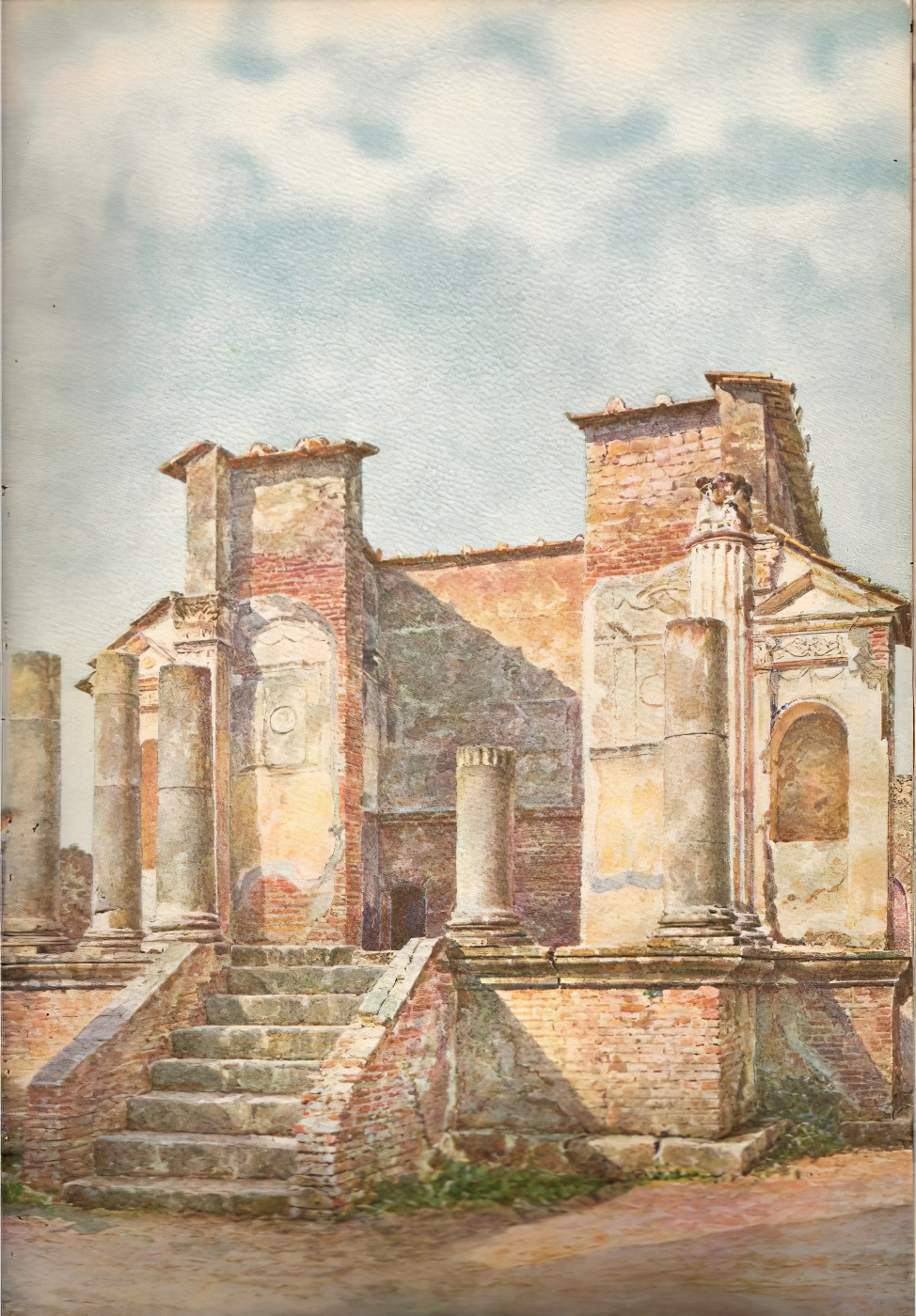
Temple of Isis

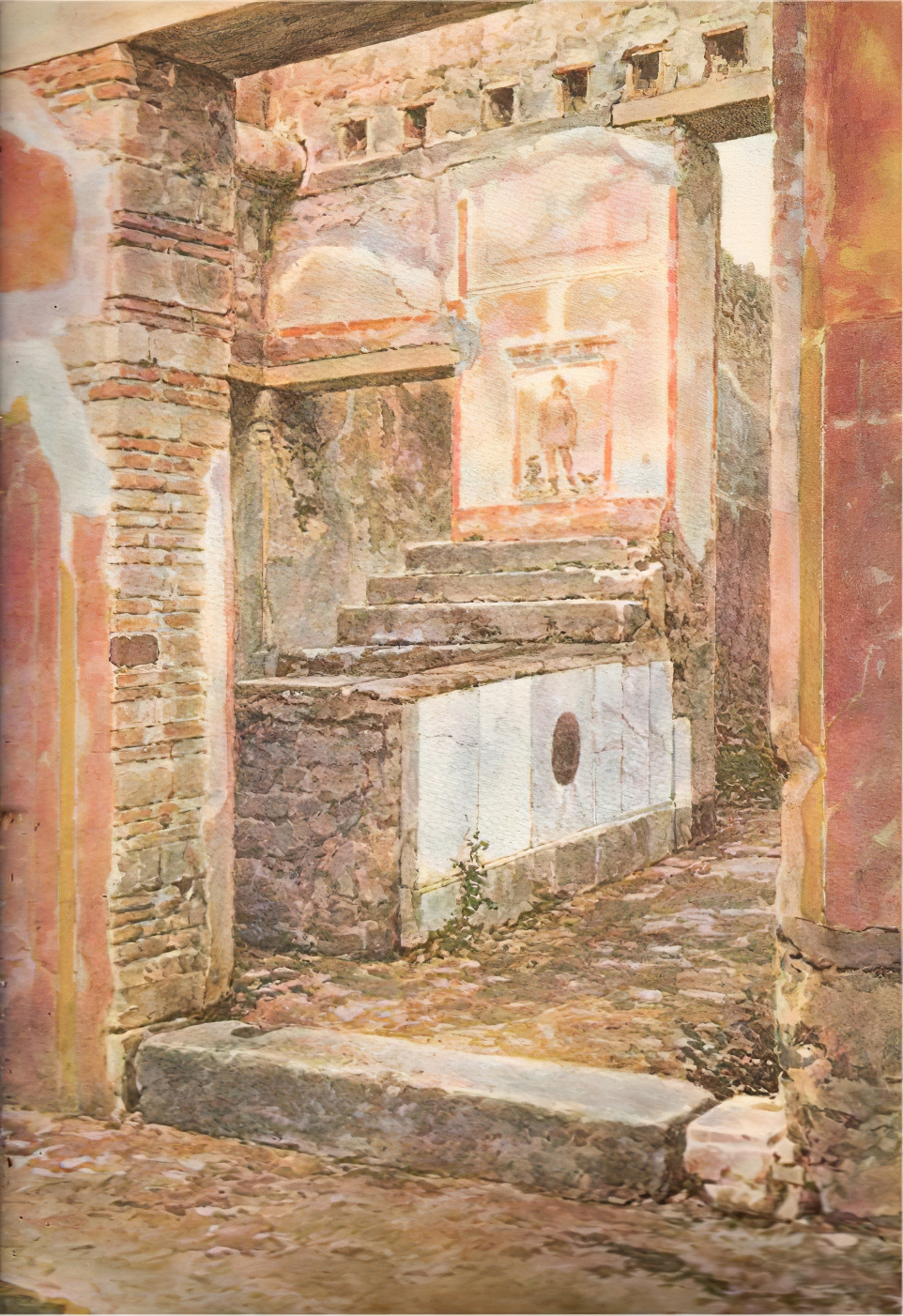
Thermopolion (fast food stall) in the alley of the rooster

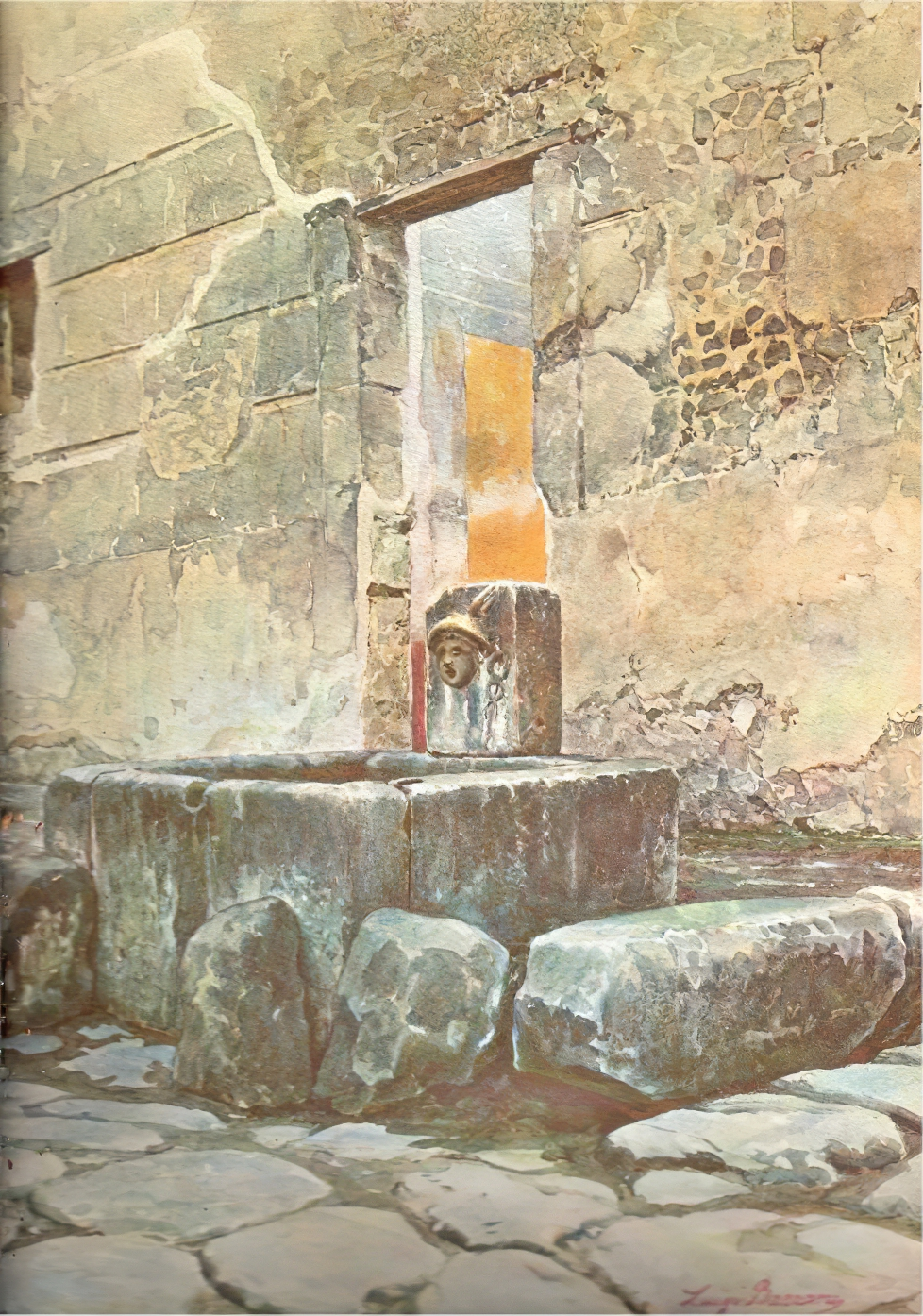
Fountain with head of Mercury on Mercury Street

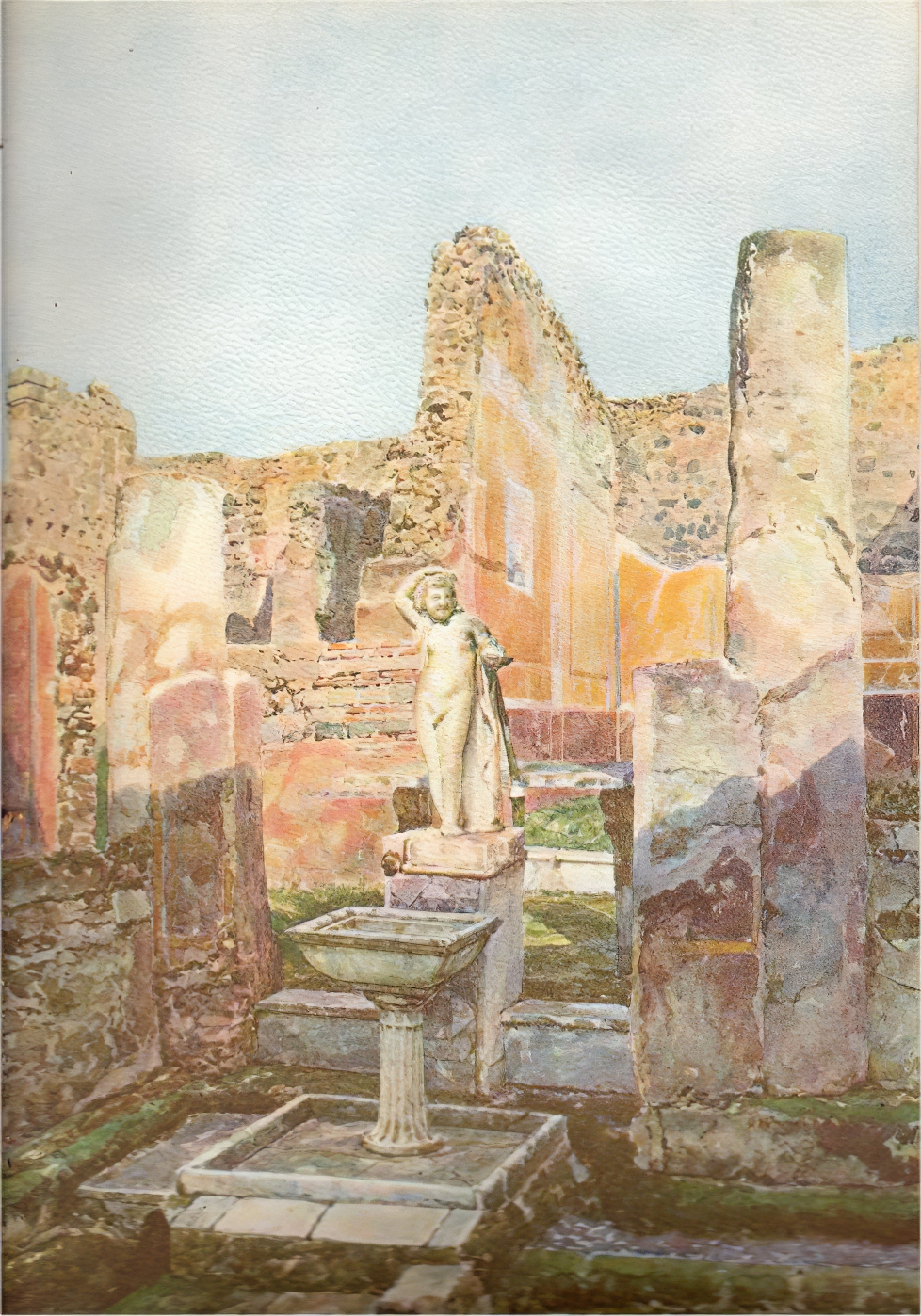
House of the Hanging Balcony

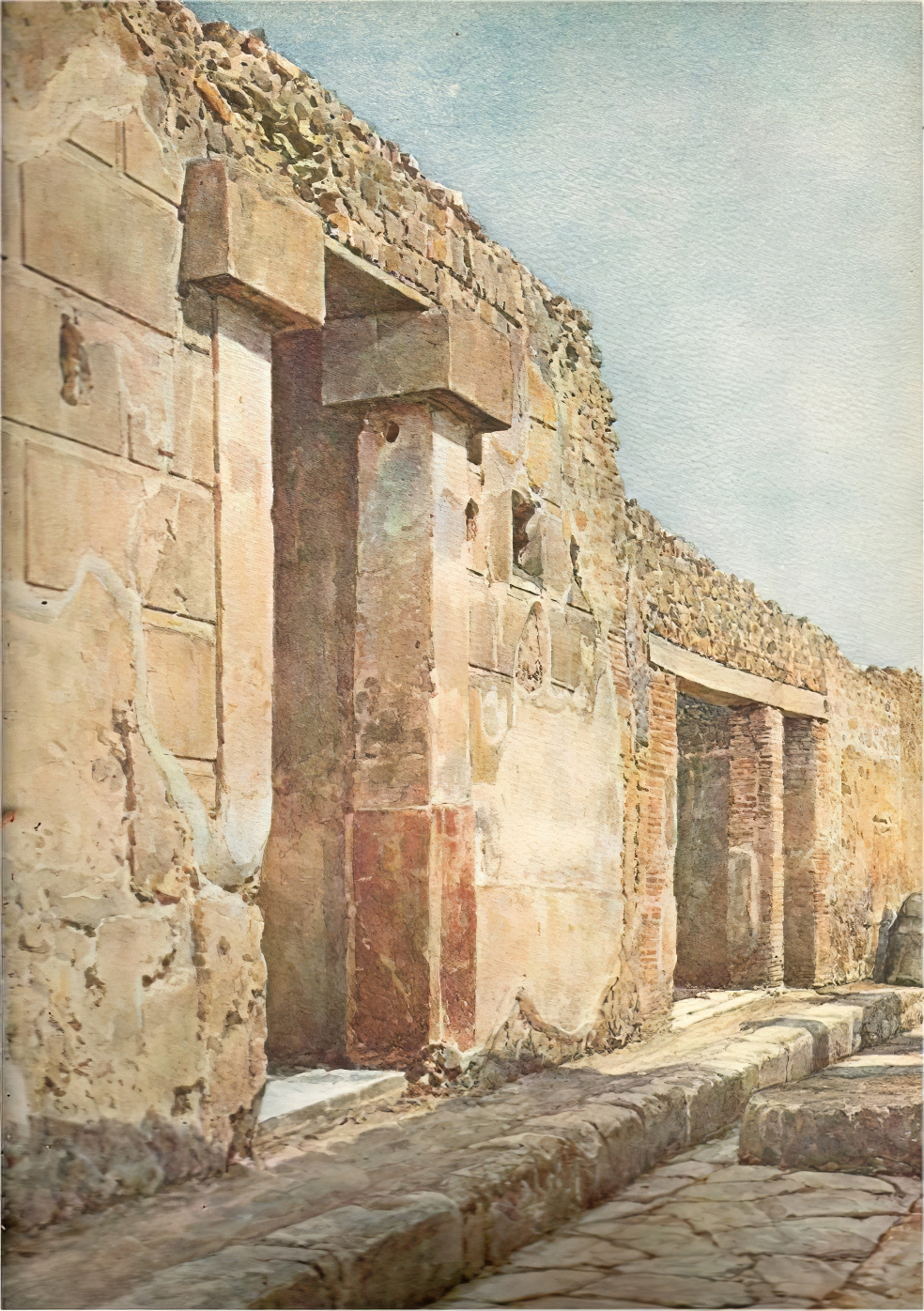
Portal of a patrician house on Augustus Street

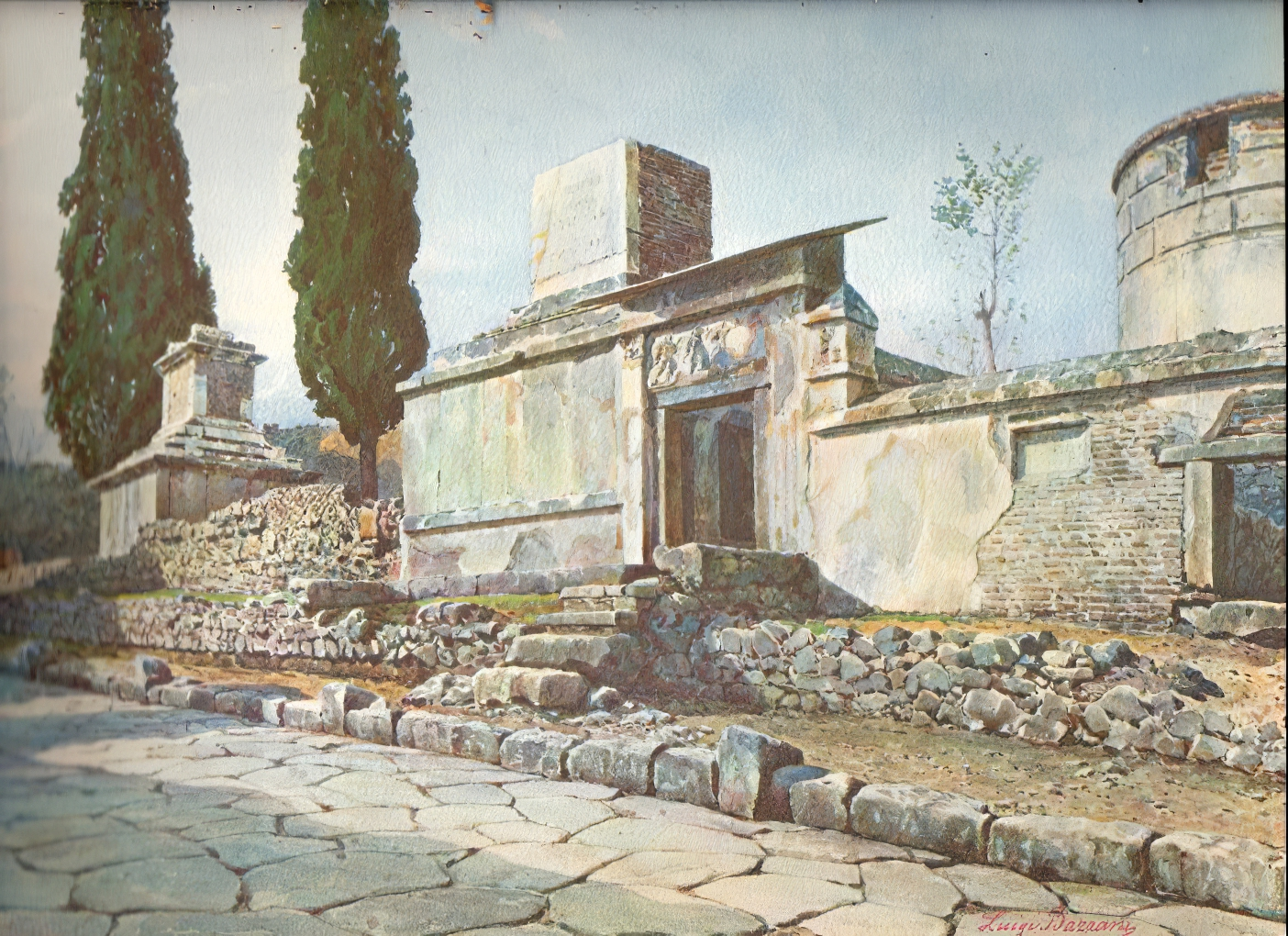
Tomb in the necropolis

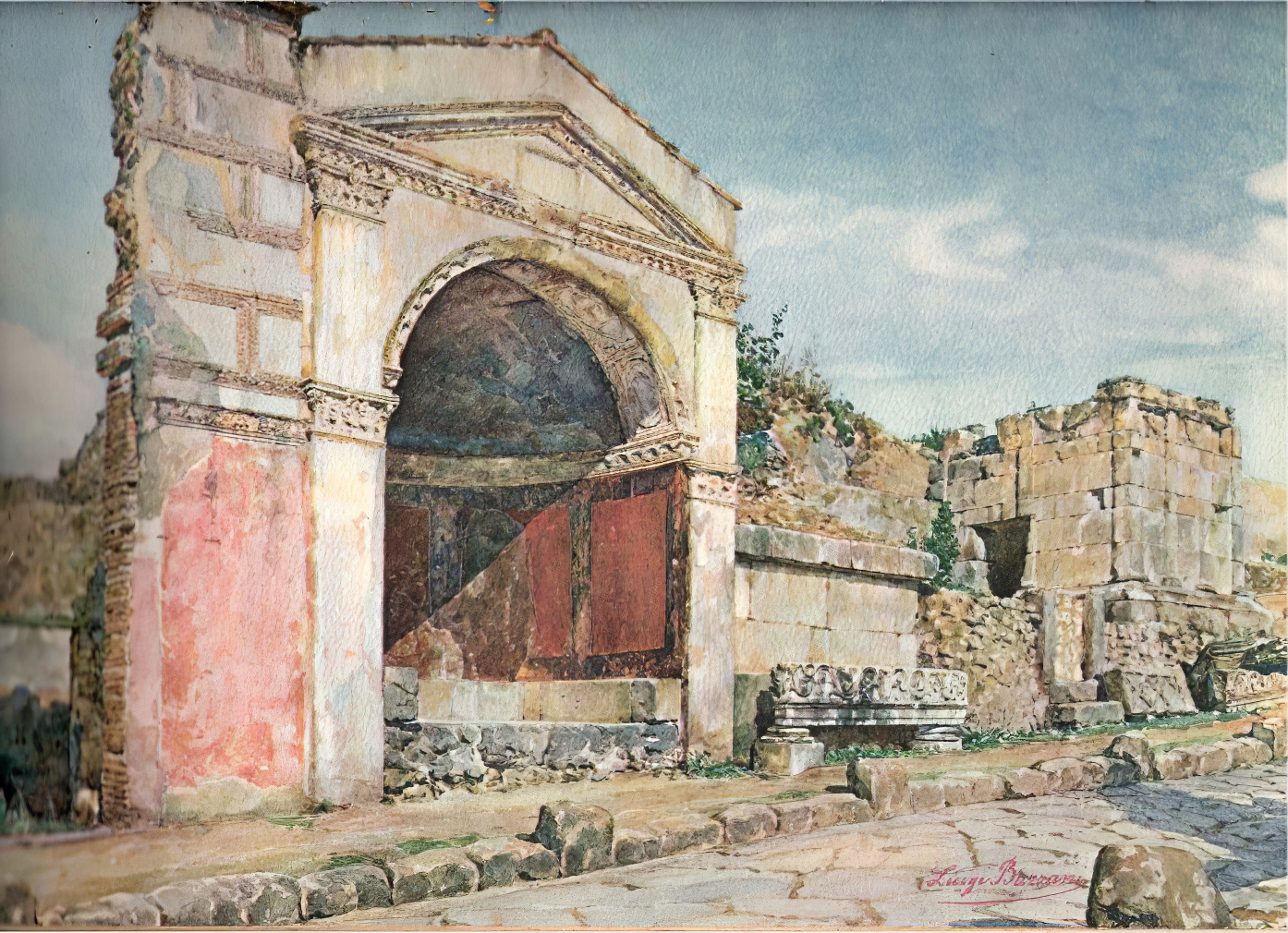
Tomb with covered niche and planter with garland

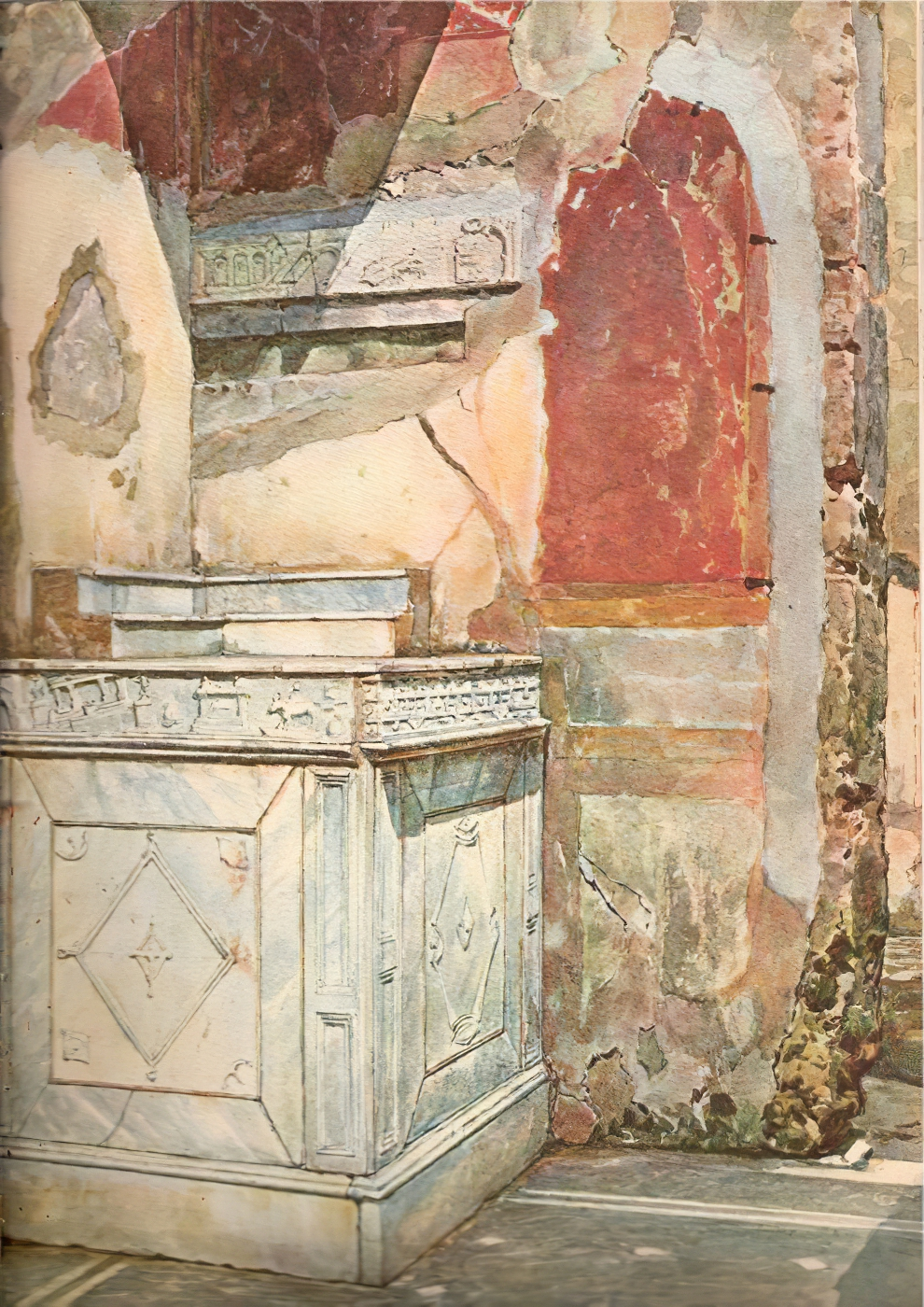
Lararium in the House of L Caecilius Jucundus

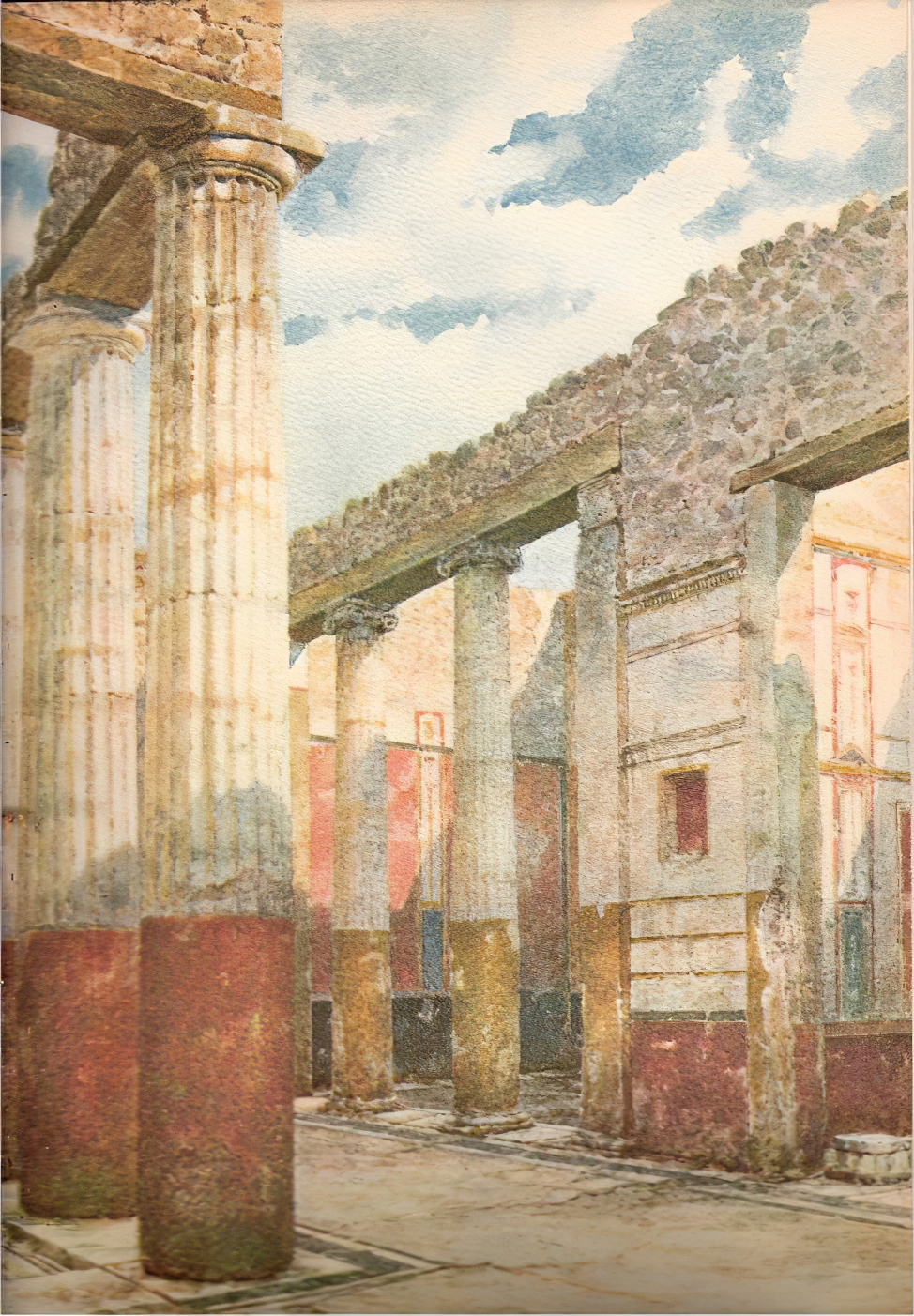
Pompeii Atrium

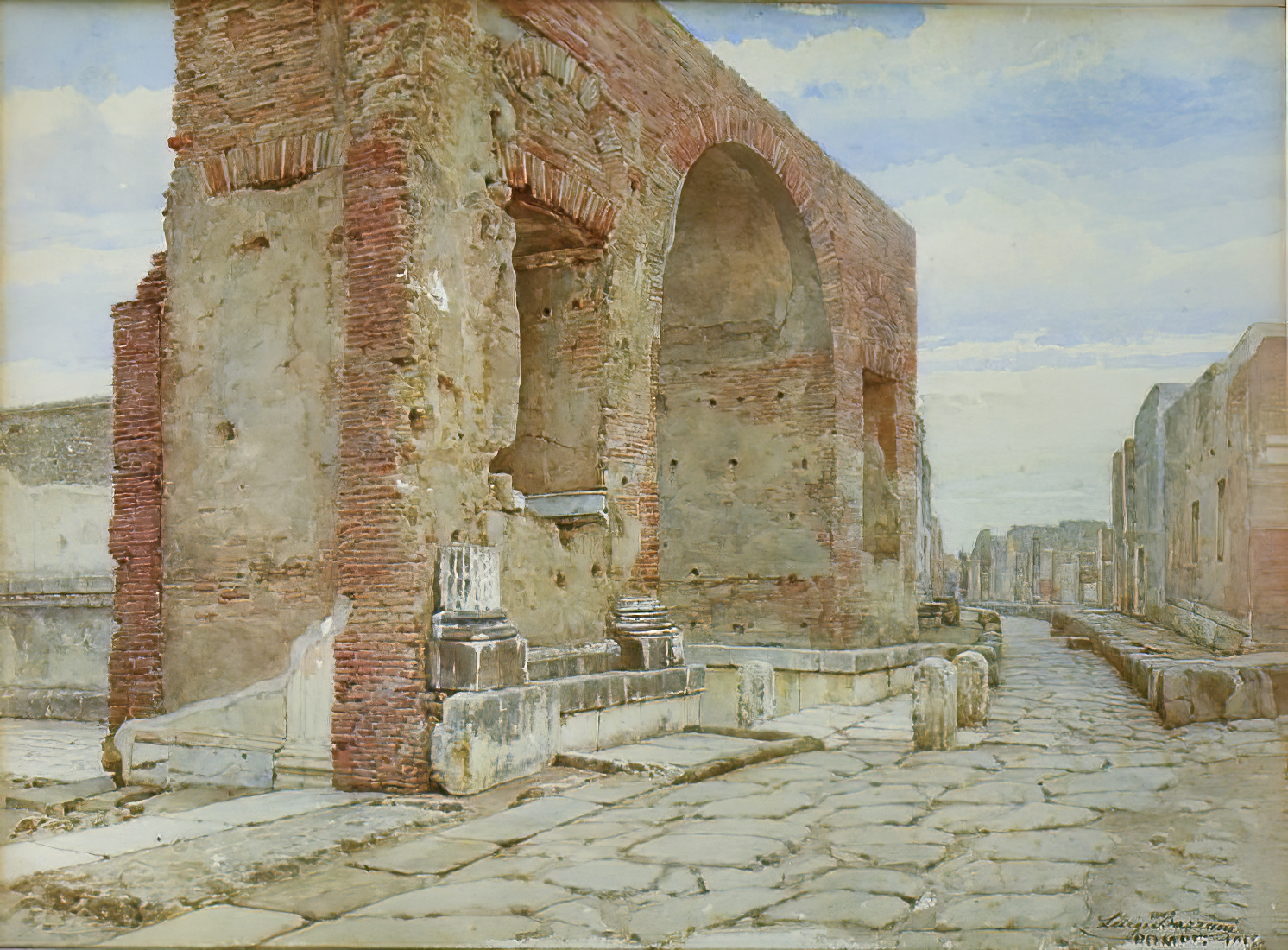
Arches of Nero in the Forum

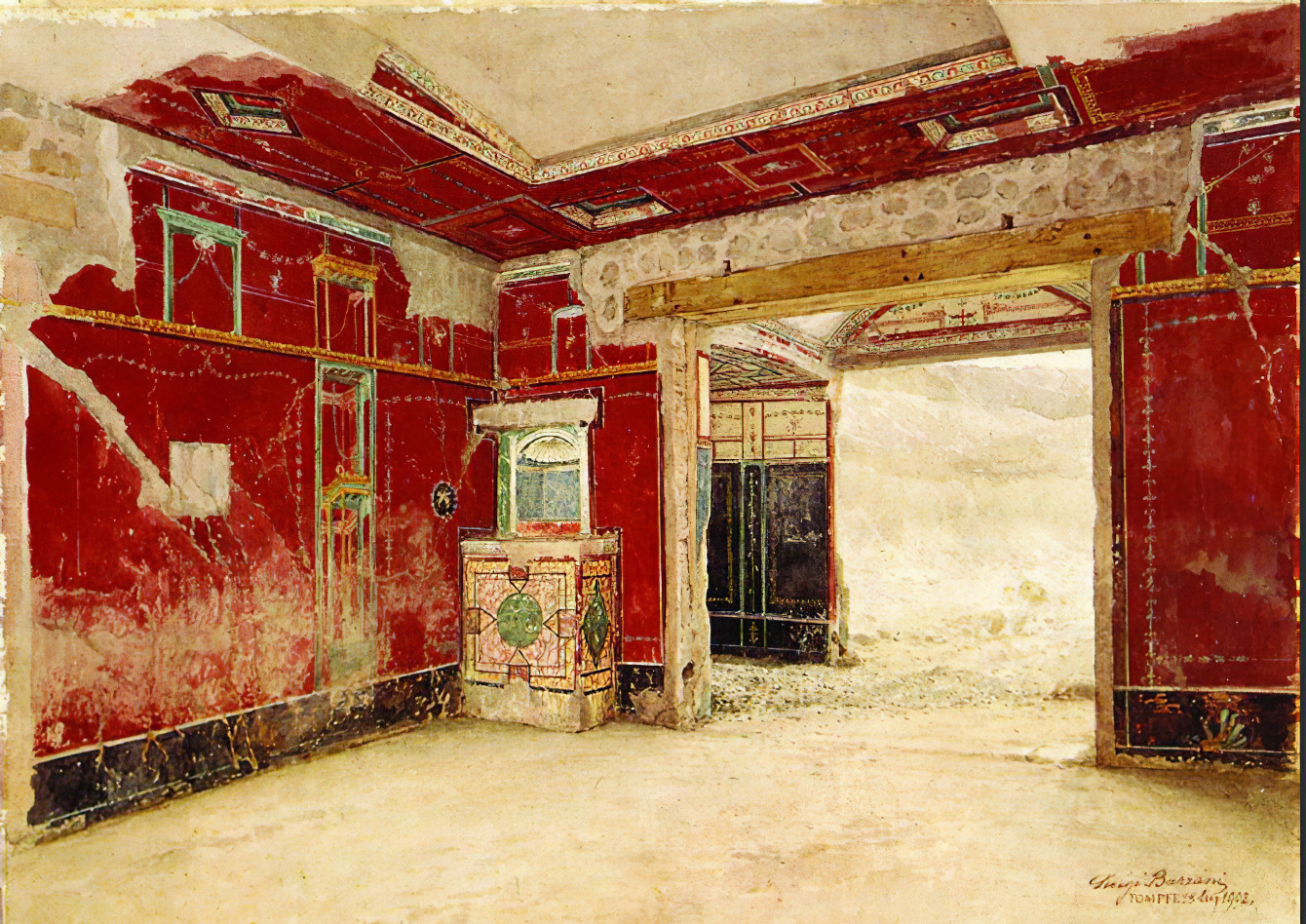
Pompeian red interior

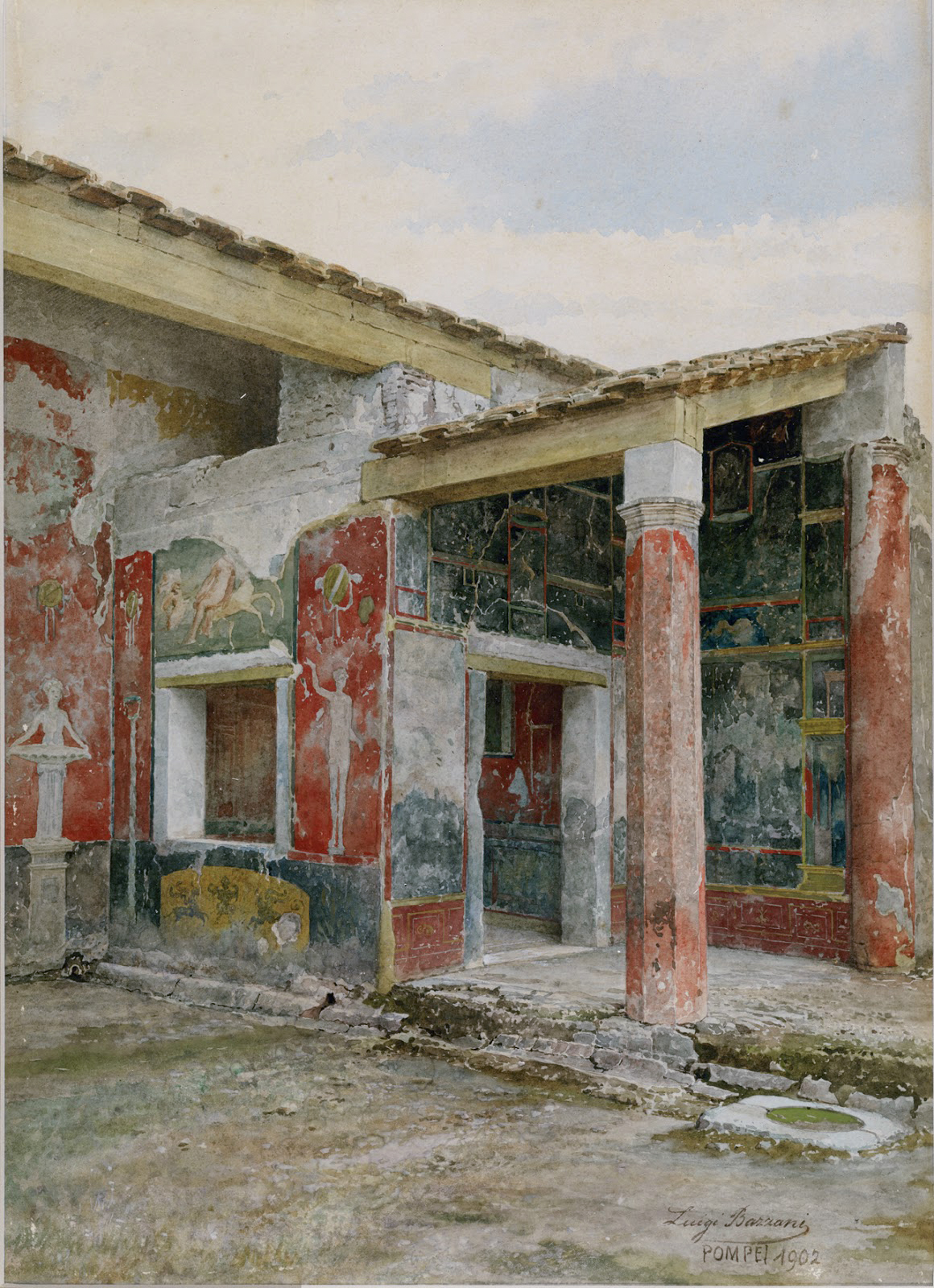
The Genaeceum (Women's Quarters) of the House of Sallust (VI 2, 4)

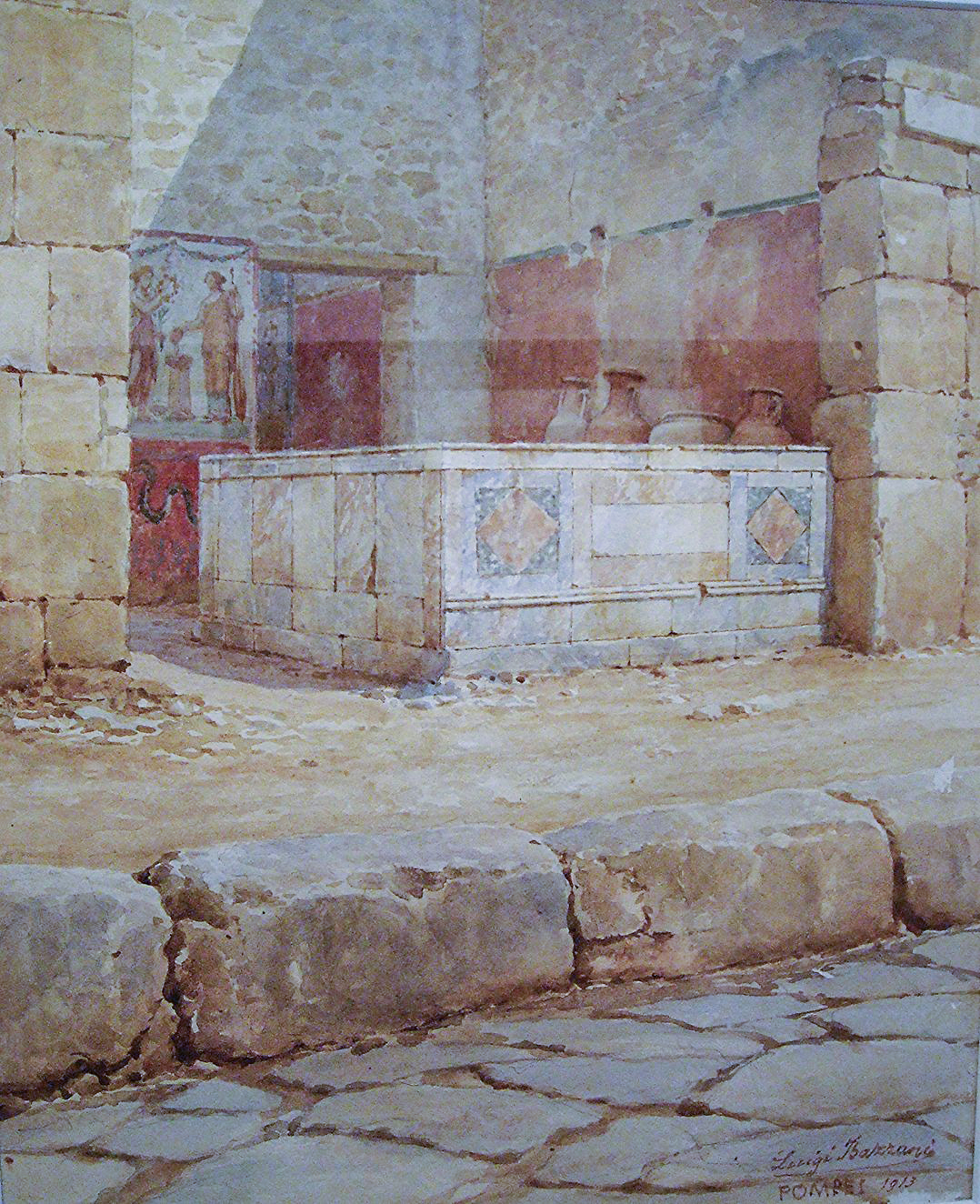
Thermopolium in the Alley of the Pharmacist

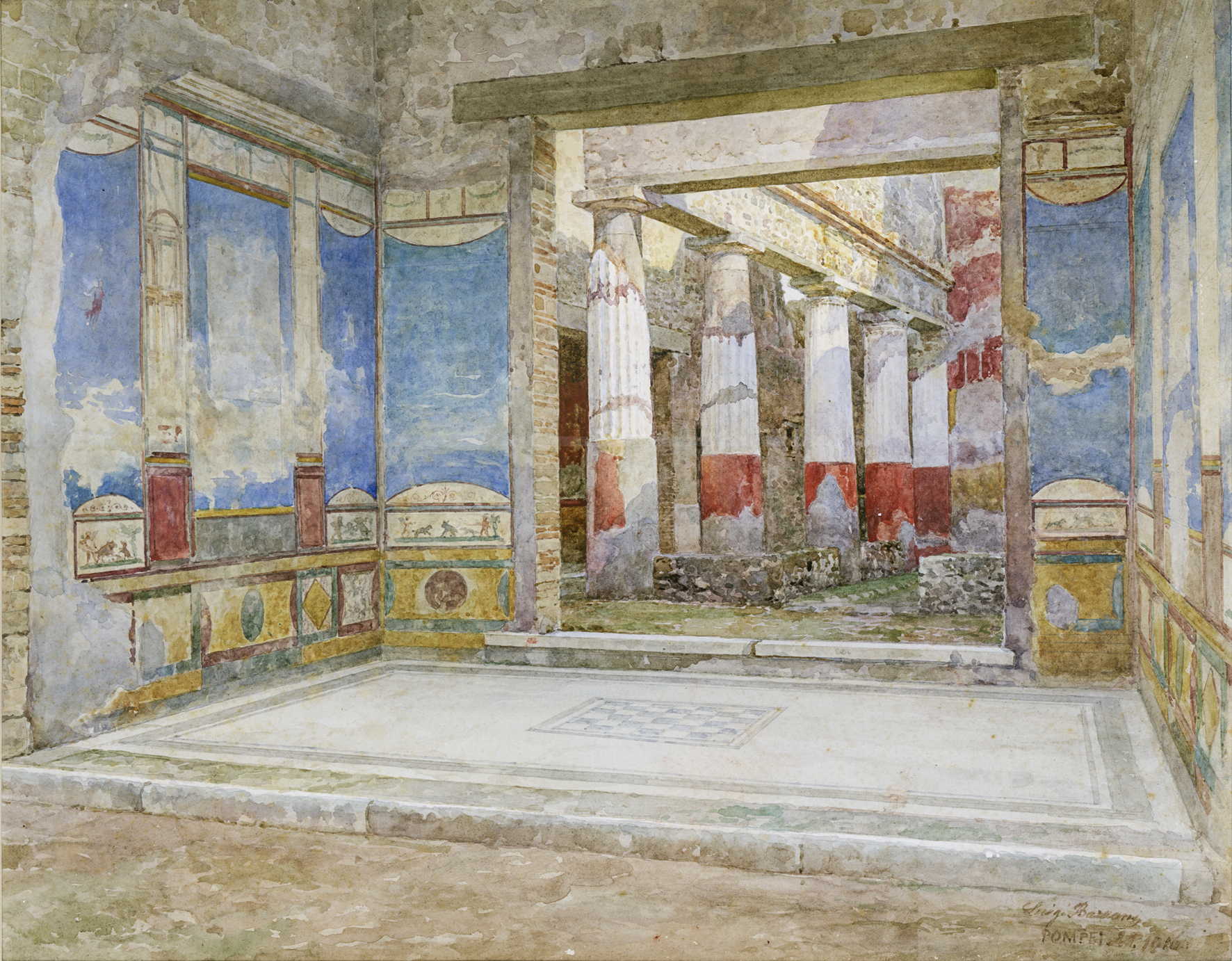
Atrium of the House of the Ancient Hunt

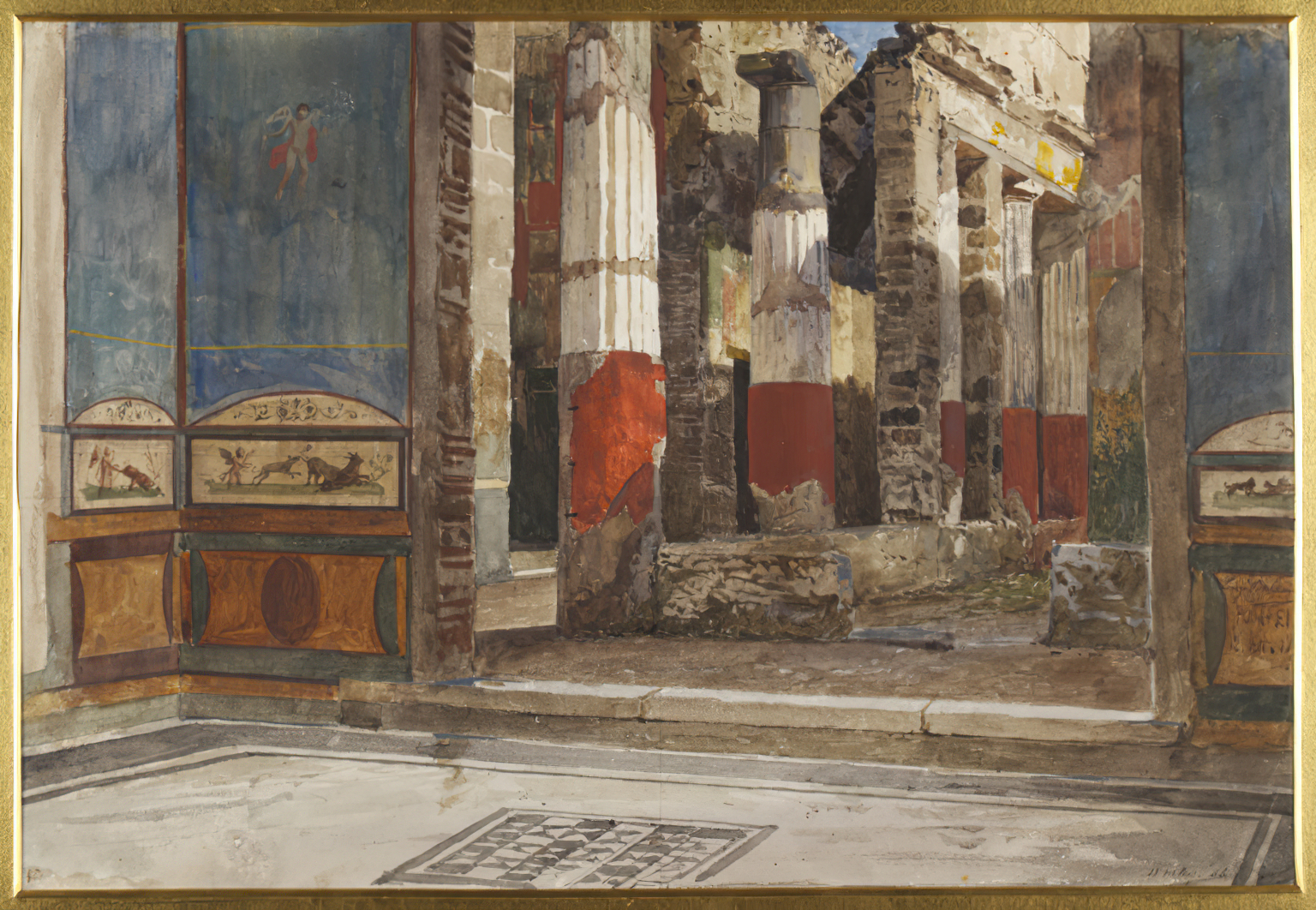
Atrium of the House of the Ancient Hunt (Detail)

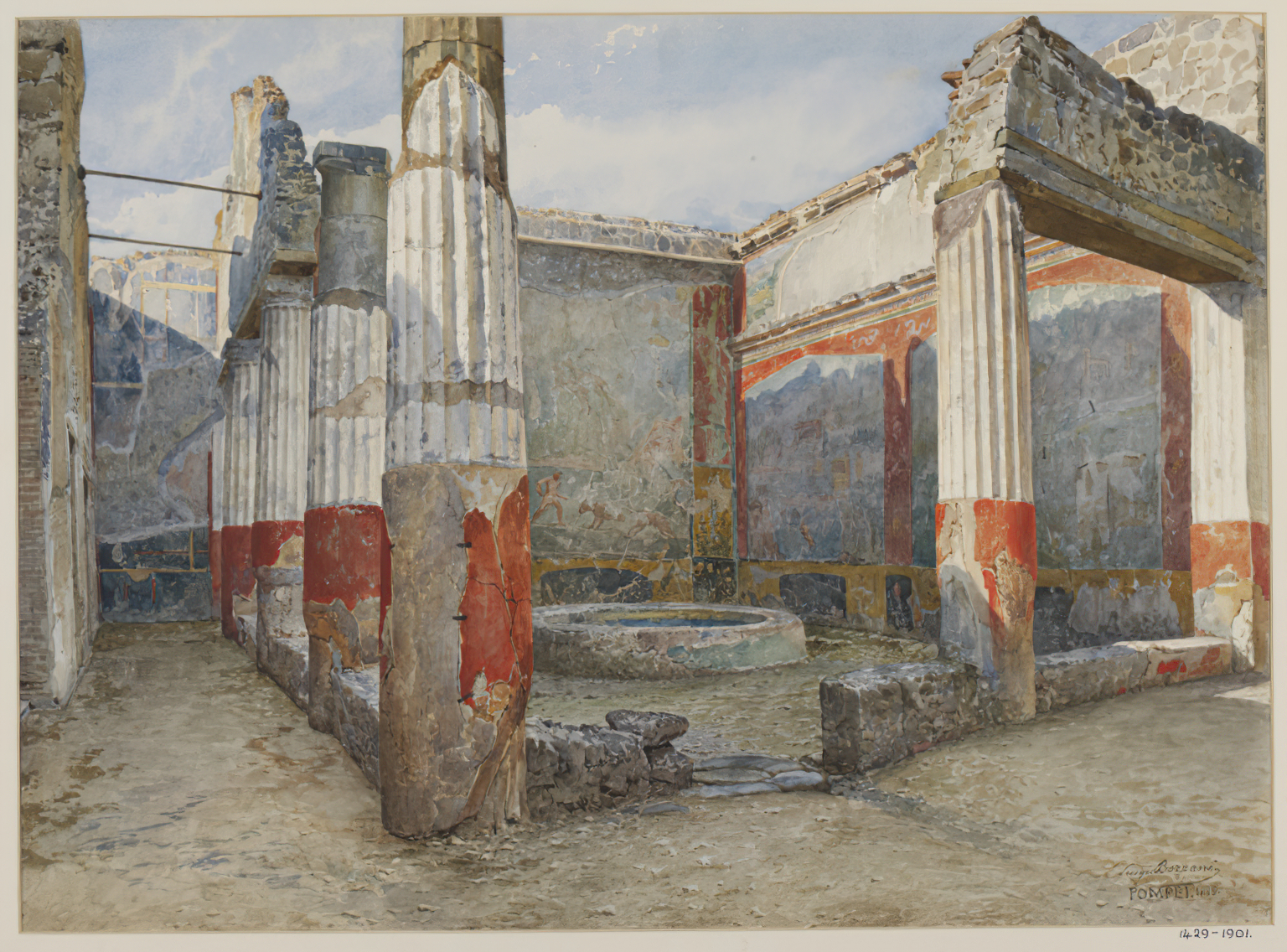
Atrium in Pompeii

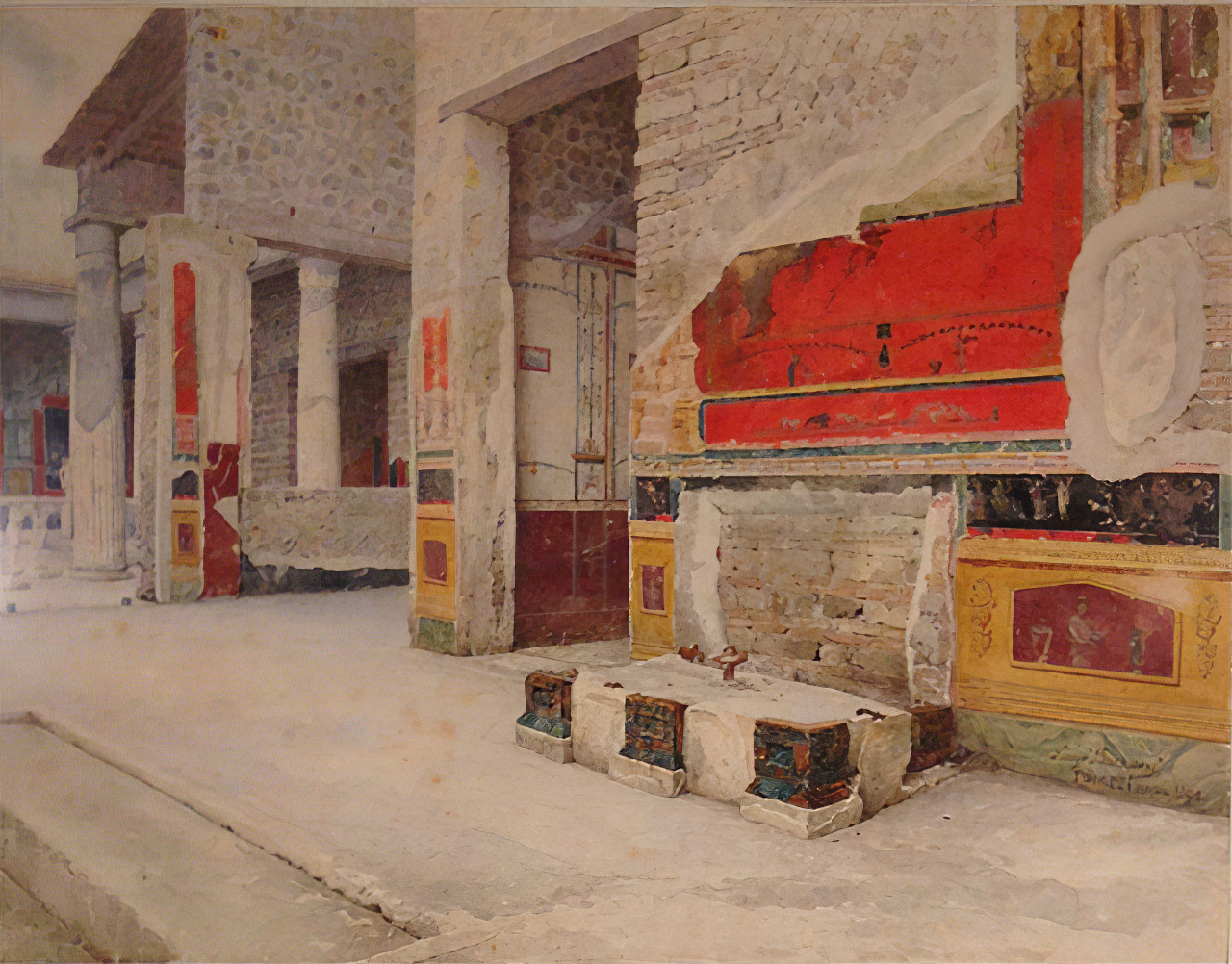
Atrium of the House of the Vetti VI.15.1

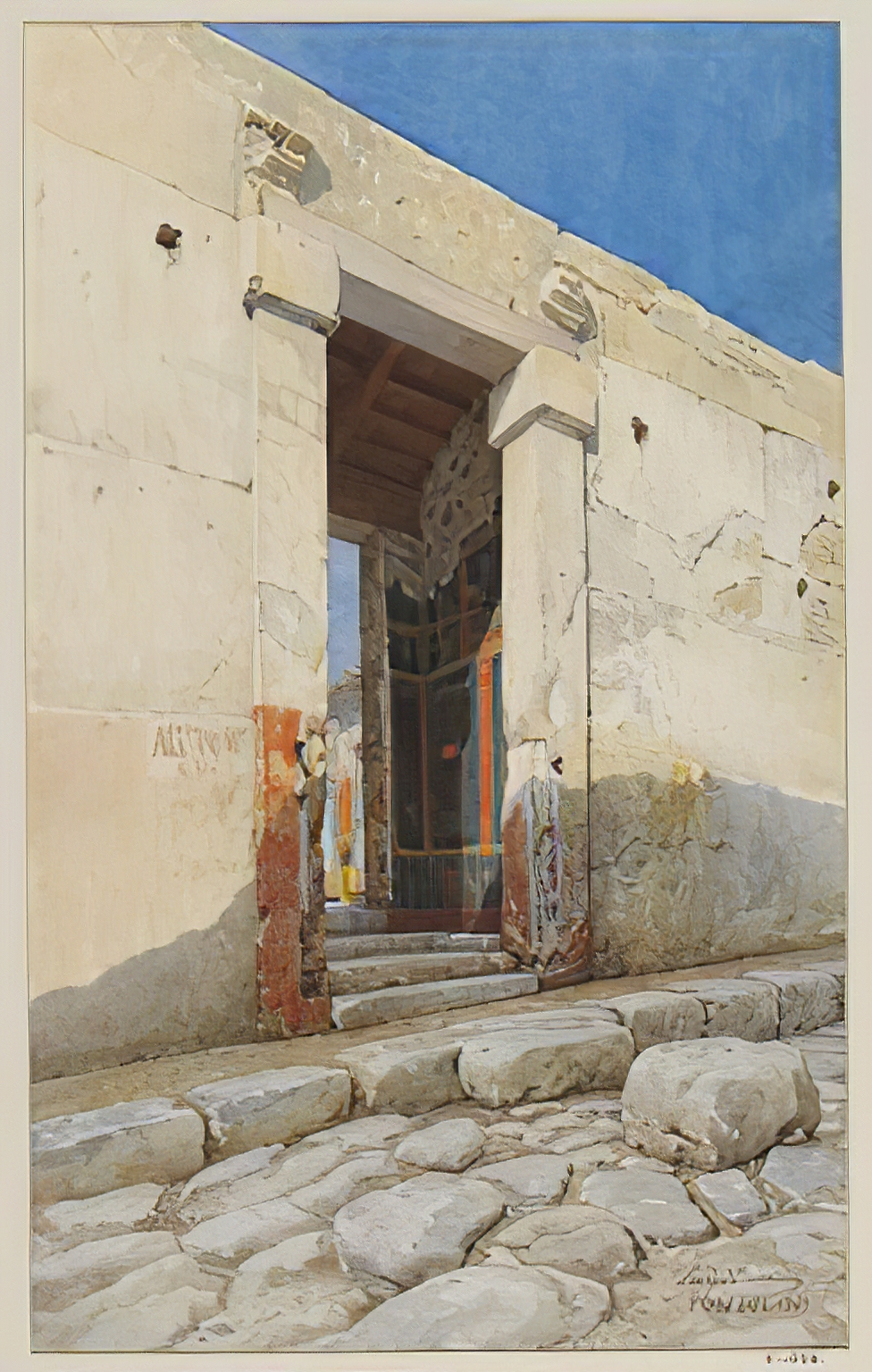
Entry to a Roman domus

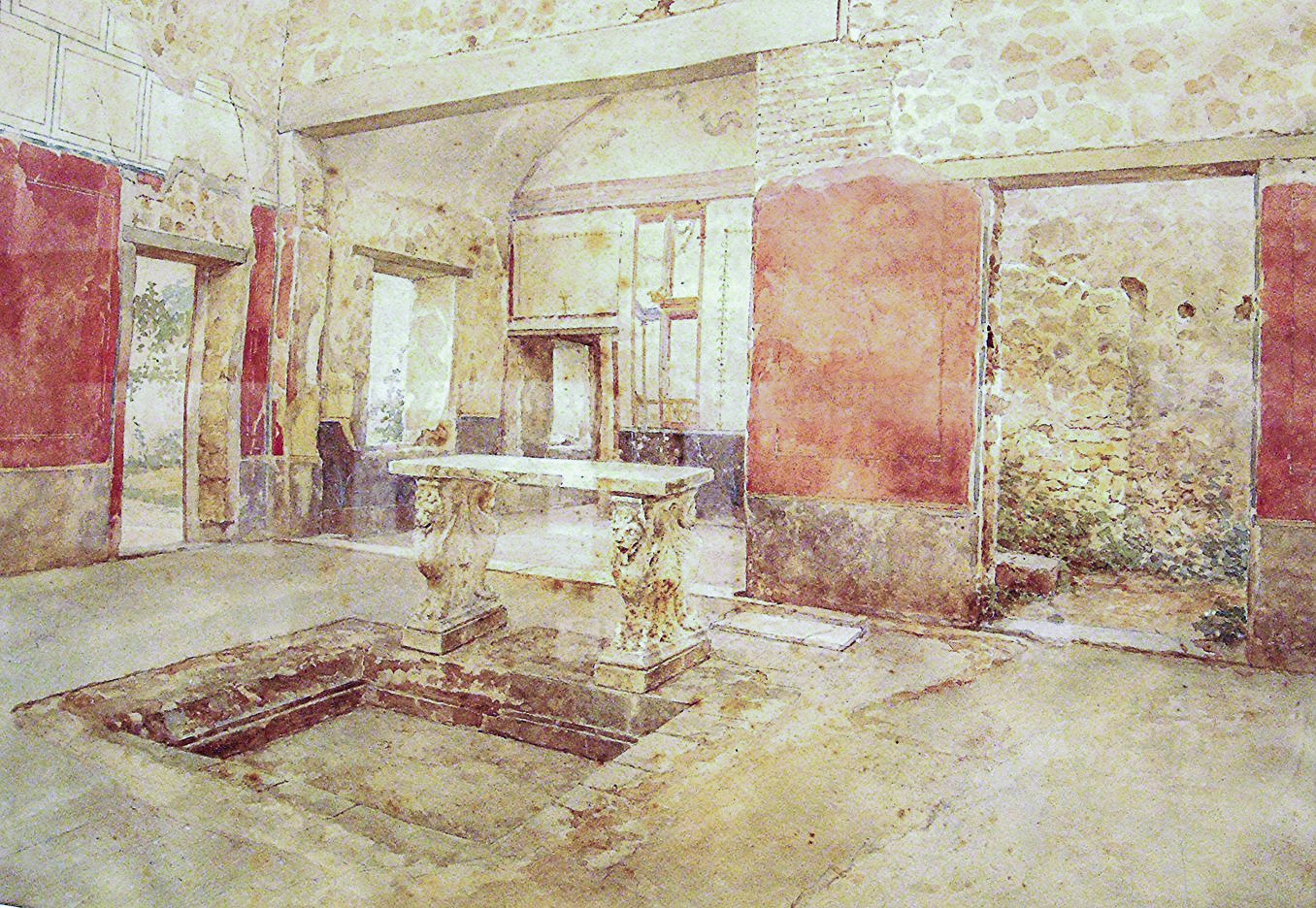
Atrium of the House of the Prince of Naples

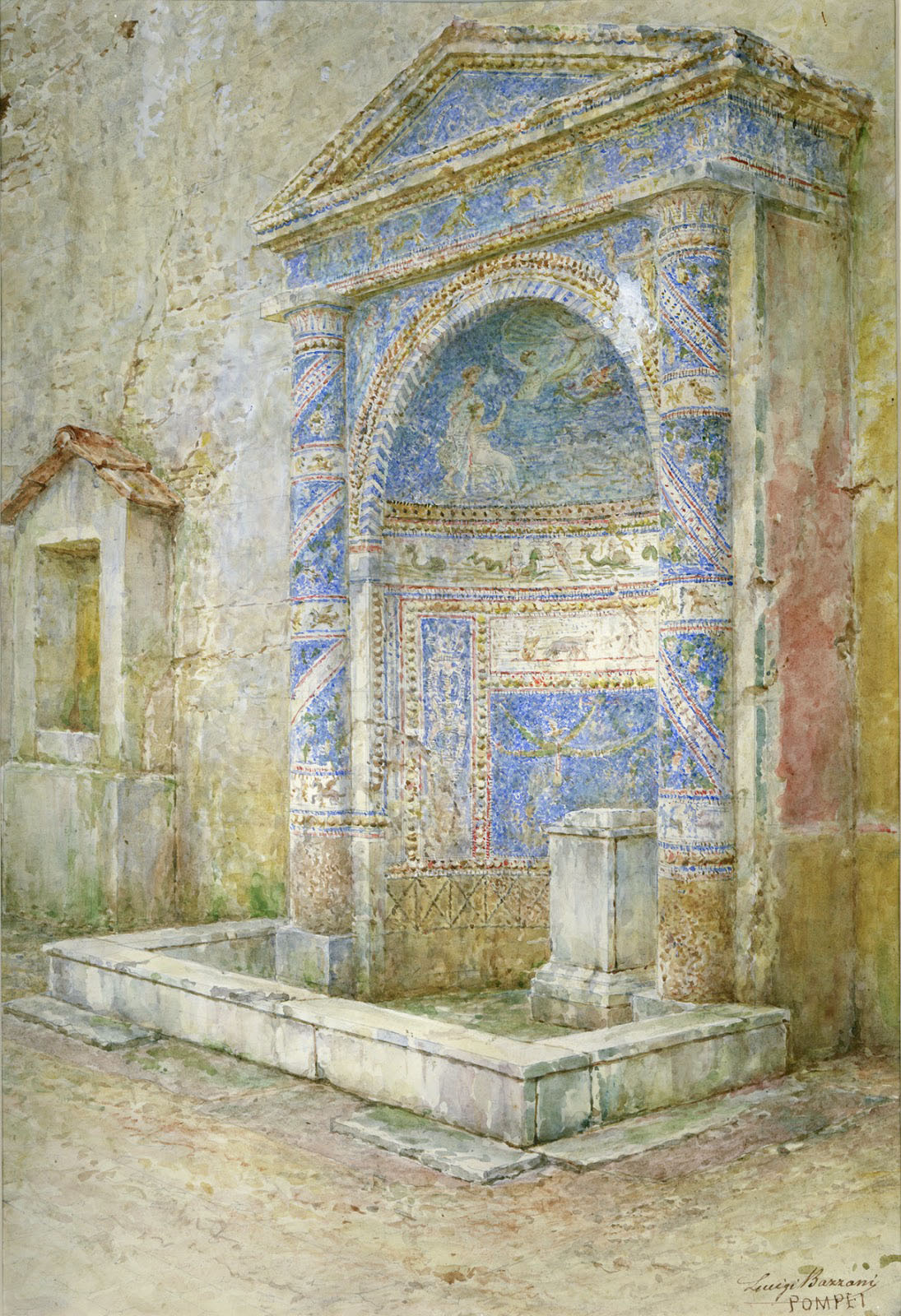
Fountain of the House of C. Virnius Modestus (IX 7, 16)

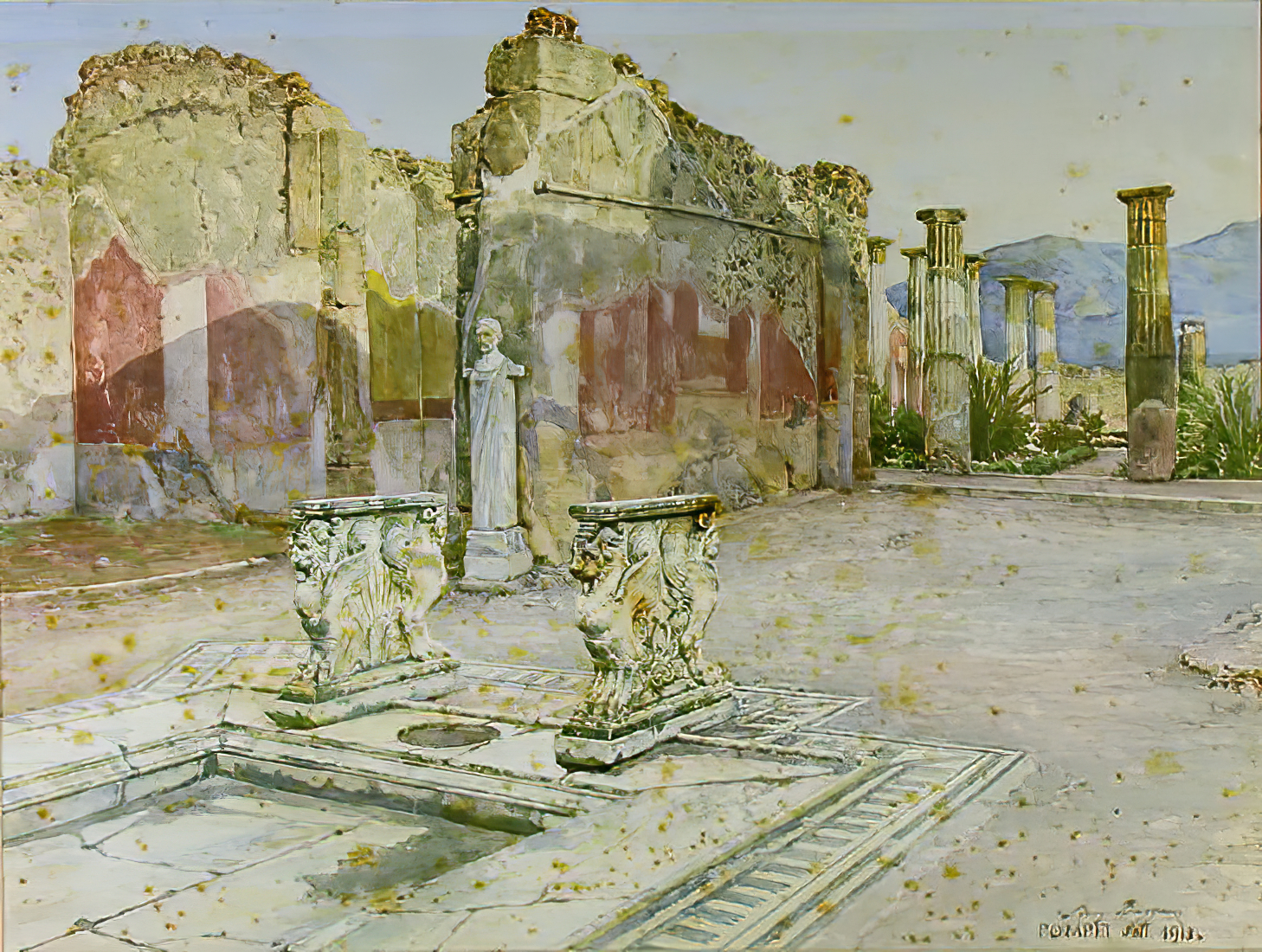
Atrium of the House of Cornelius Rufus

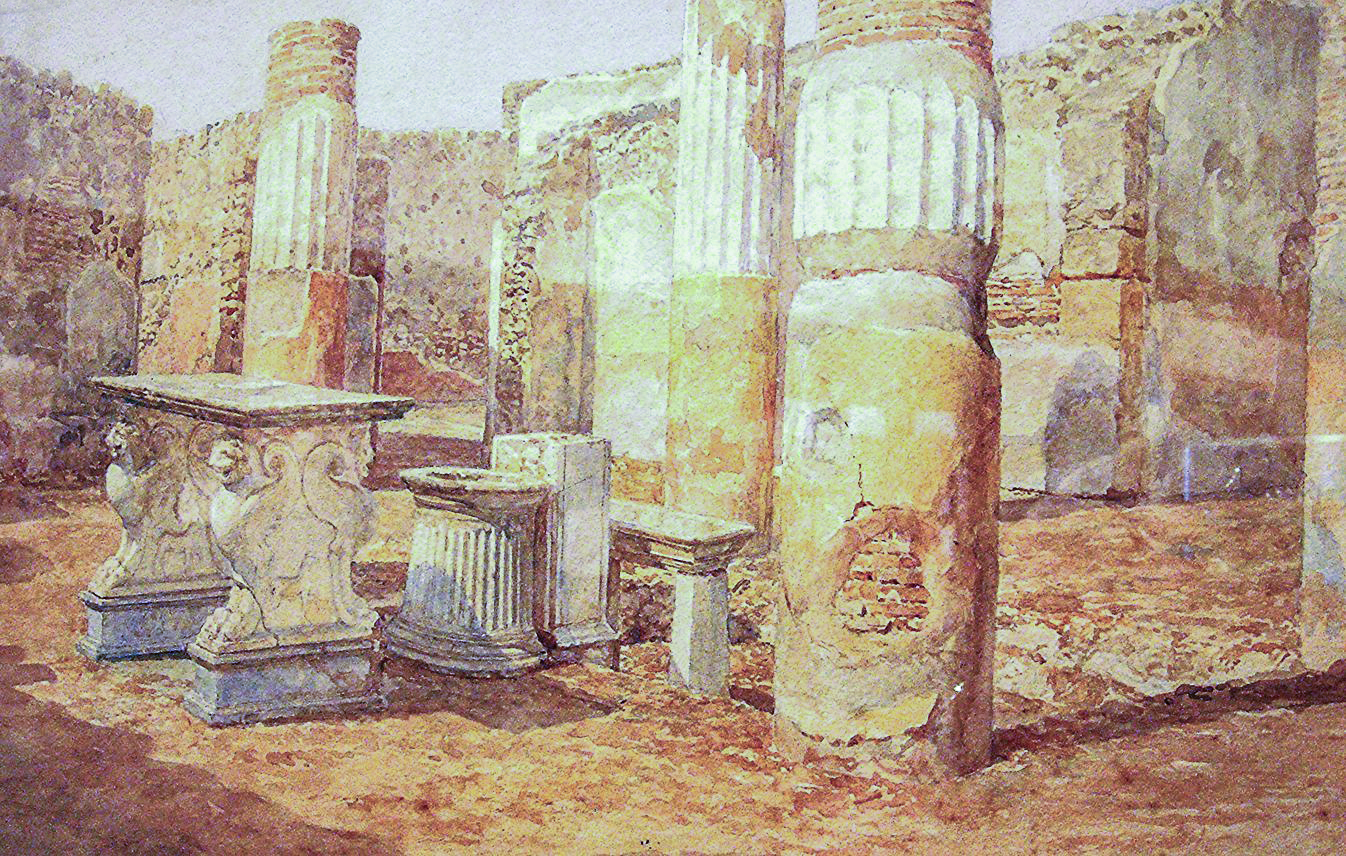
Colonnade of the House of Cornelius Rufus

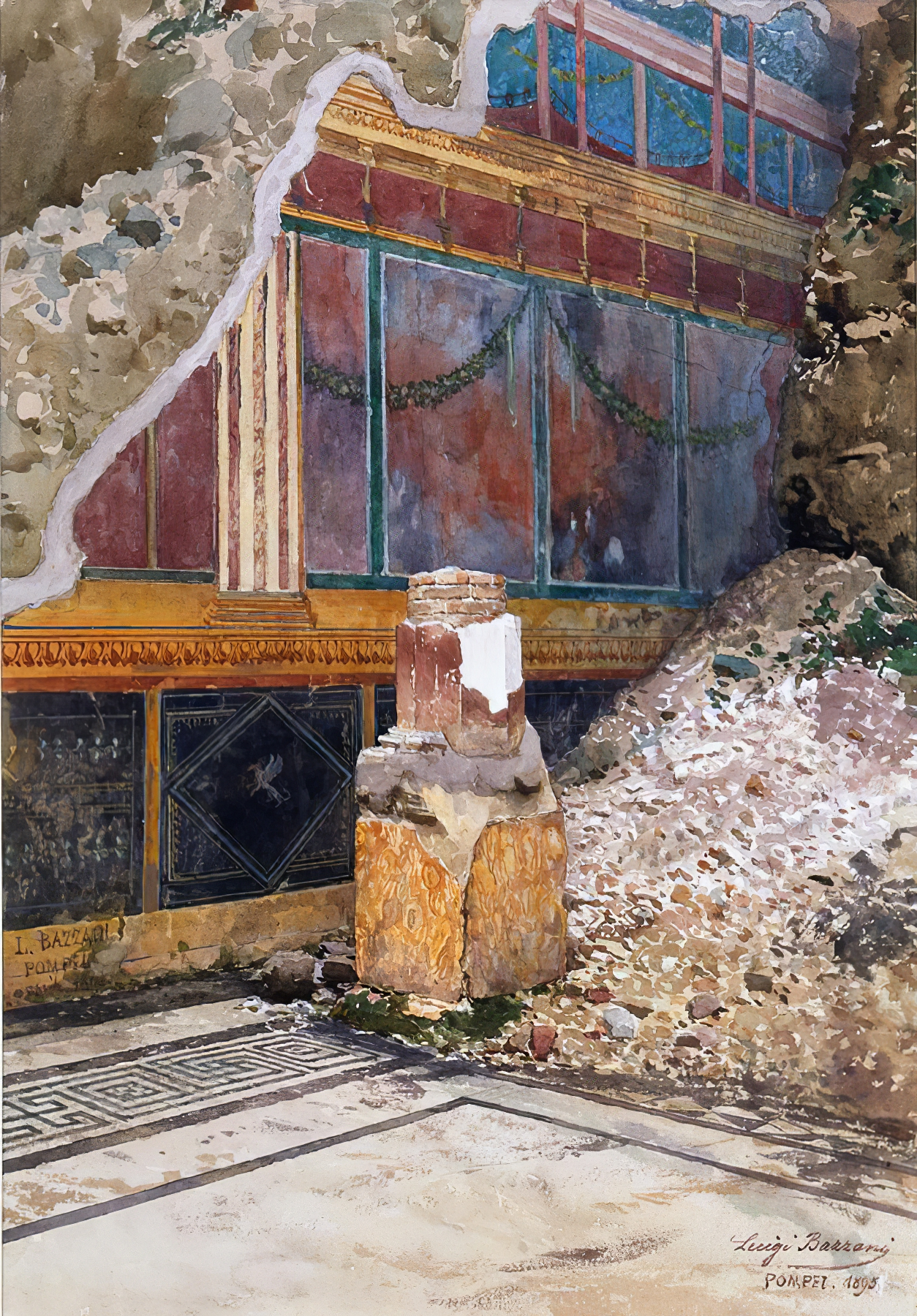
House of the Silver Wedding

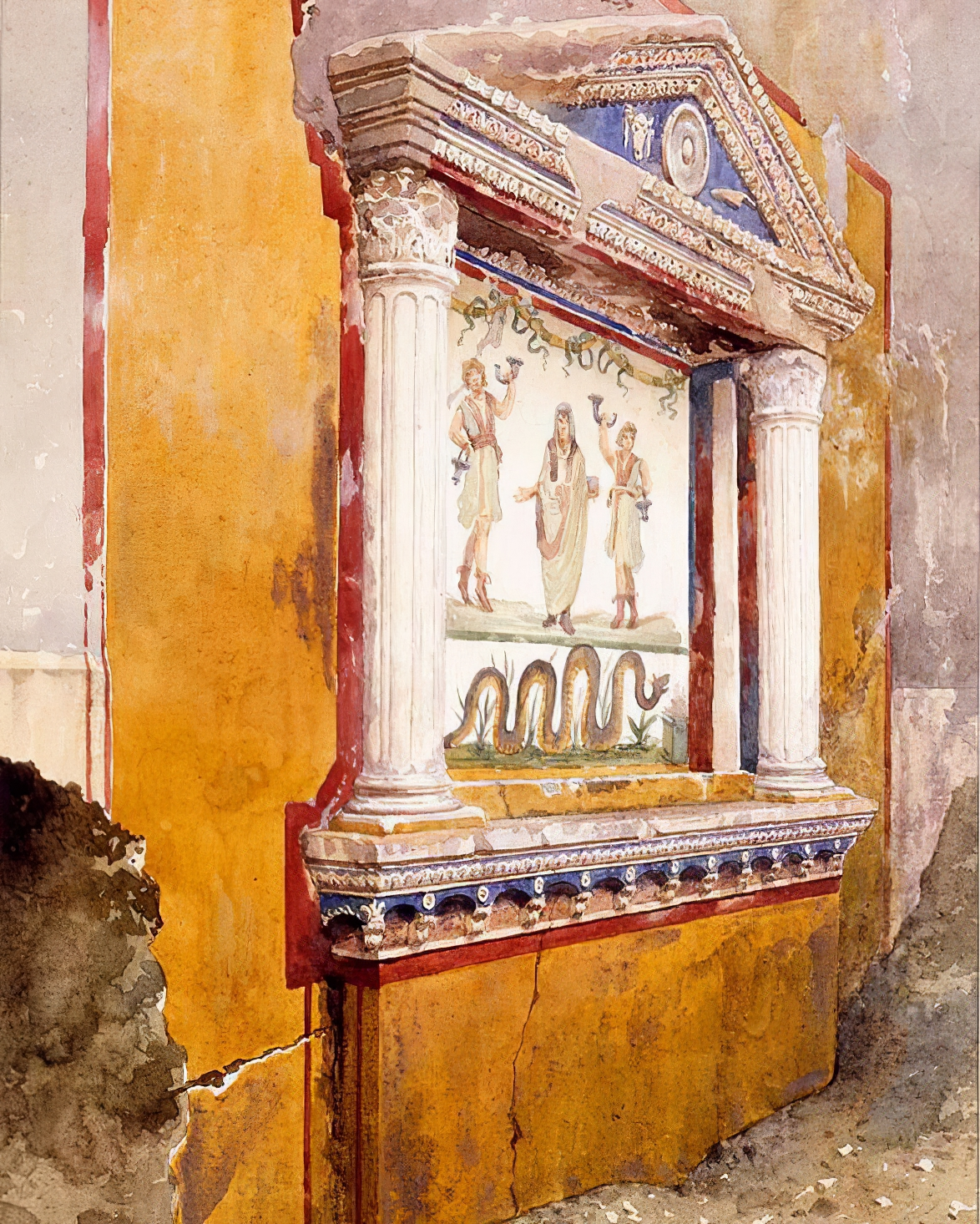
Lararium of a family altar, seen in situ after excavation, House of Aulus Vettius, Pompeii, c36-39 CE, 1895

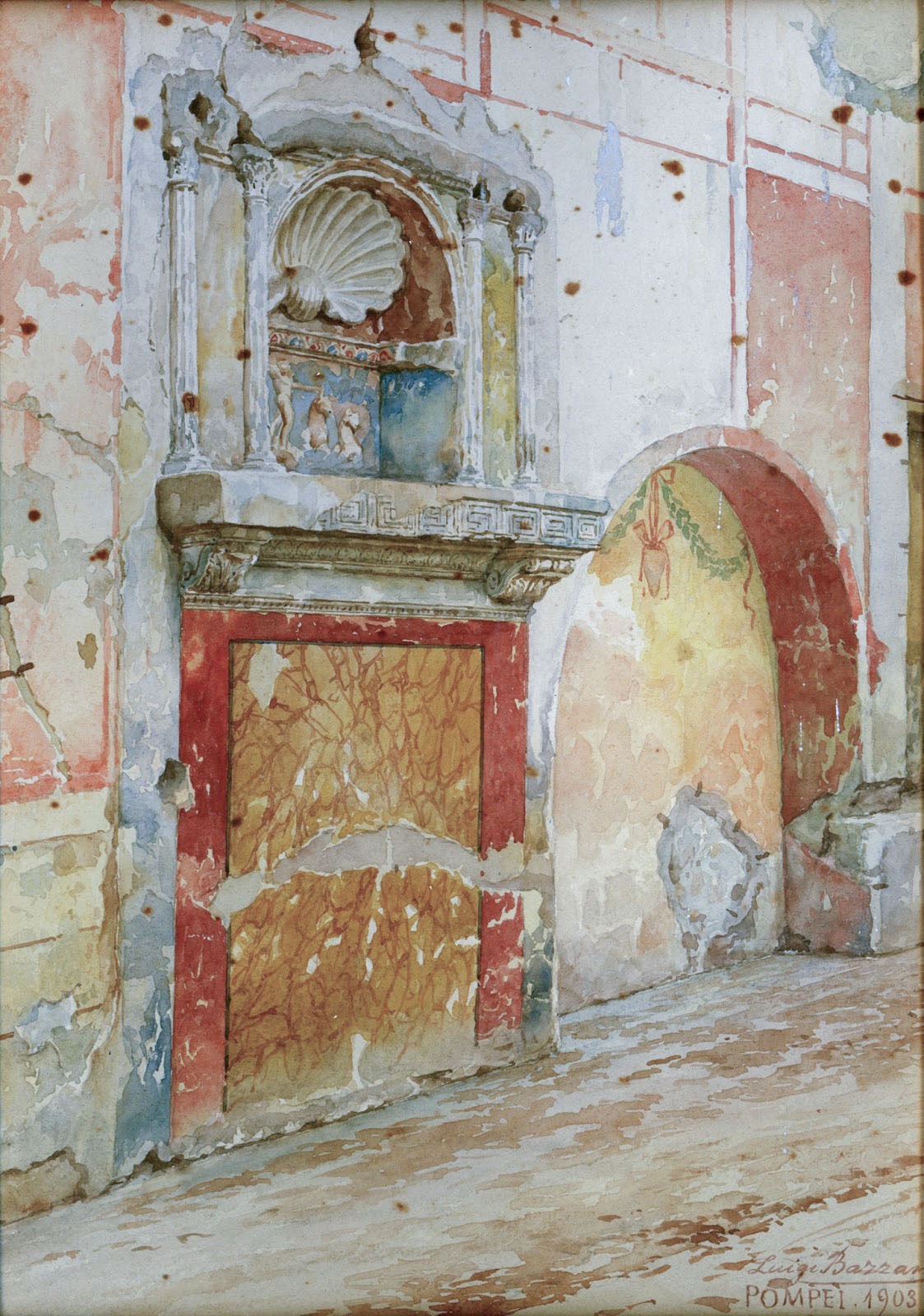
Lararium of the House of Paccius Alexander (IX 1, 7)

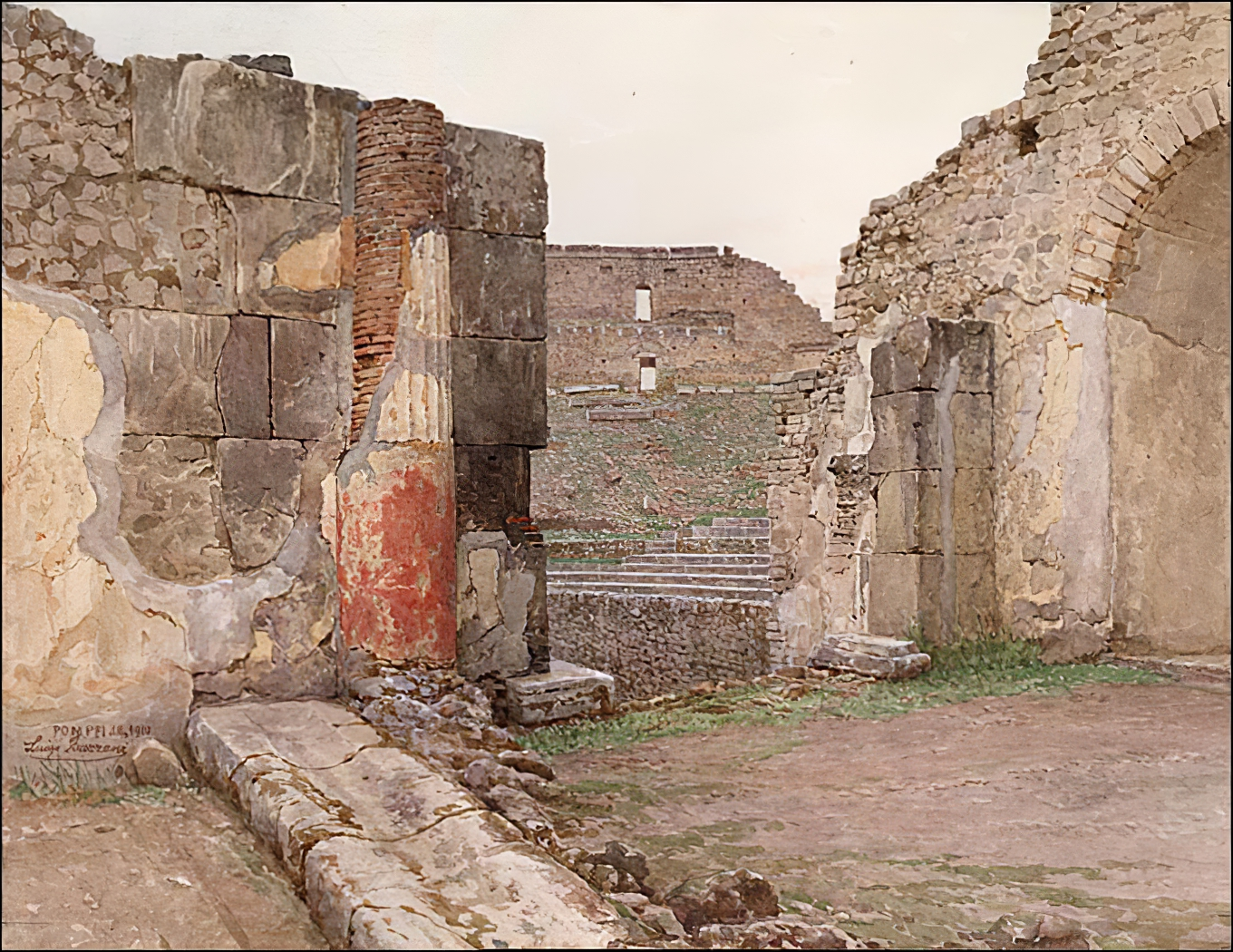
Large theater in Pompeii, 1910,

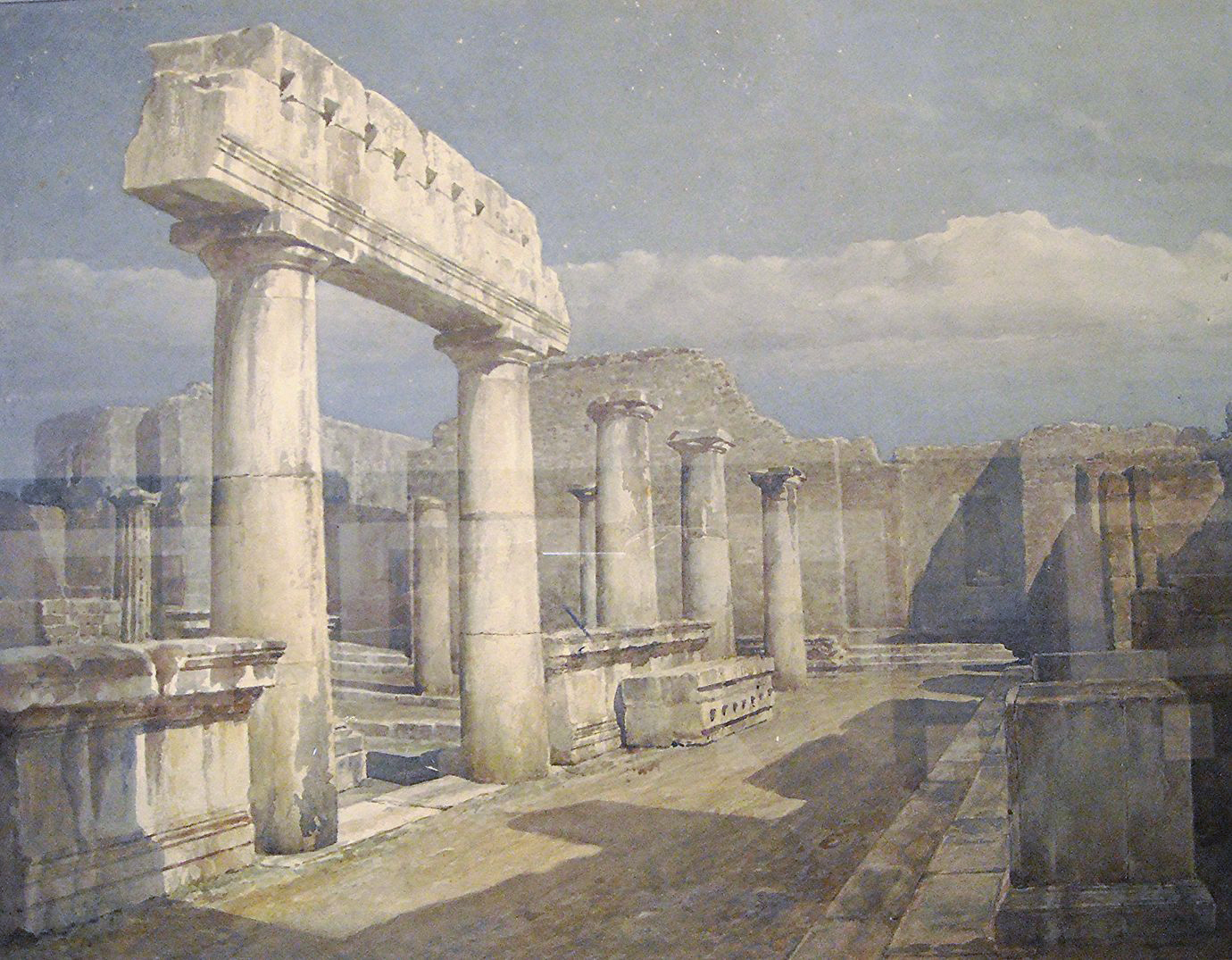
Pompeii forum

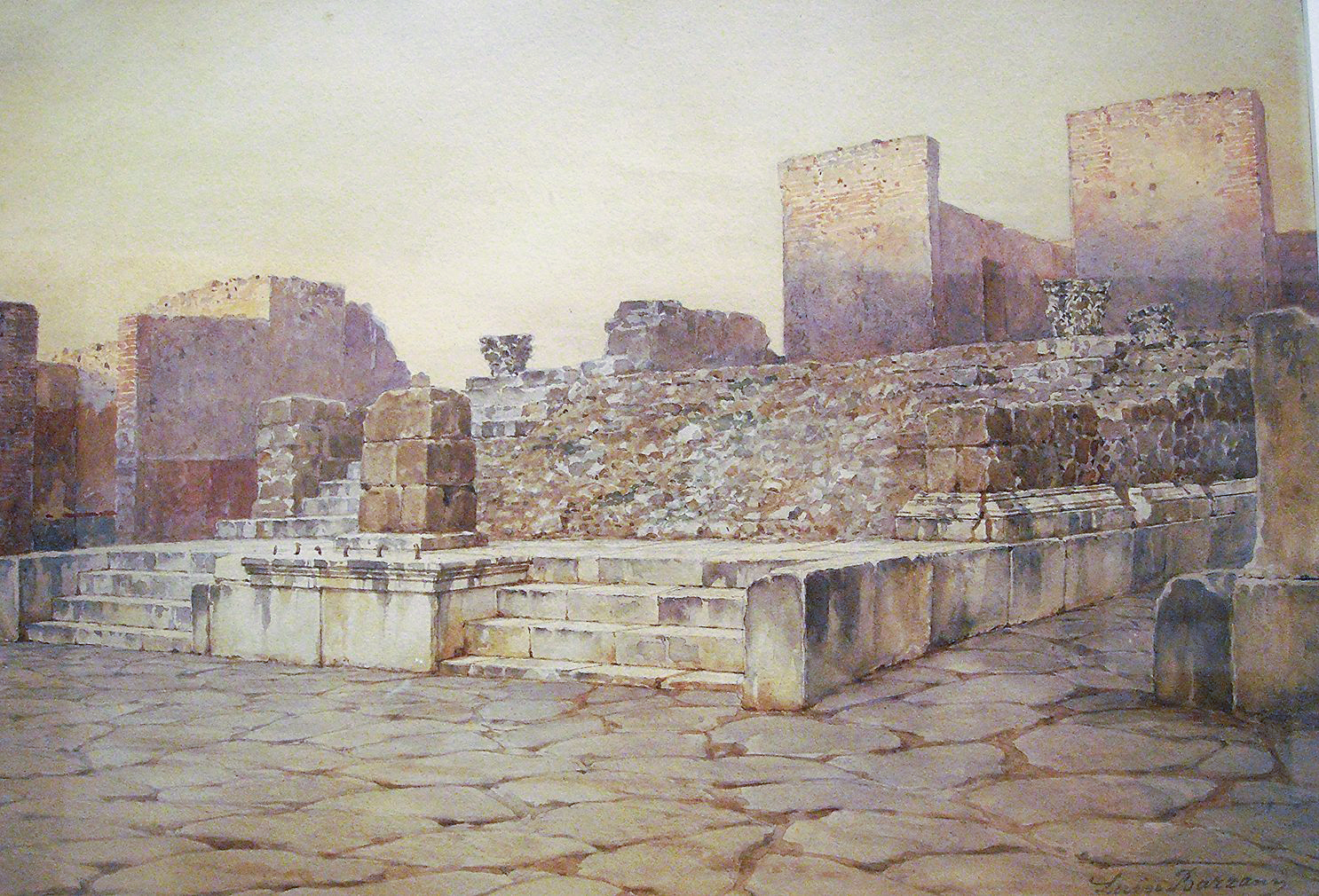
The Temple of Fortuna Augusta

==== Reconstruction Efforts ====
Amedeo Maiuri, director of Pompeii and Herculaneum from 1924 to 1961, was intent on re-creating the "atmosphere" of the two towns as they were before the eruption of Mt. Vesuvius. Though some directors before him had taken limited steps towards this, Maiuri was motivated to reconstruct much of the two towns' infrastructure. This meant rebuilding walls and roofs that the eruption had knocked down to reproduce the towns' facade. The rebuilding was particularly important in Pompeii, where the explosions destroyed the roofs and anything more than two meters above ground level.

The materials used in this reconstruction were mainly concrete and steel. The mix of the cement was harmful to the original construction in multiple locations. The alkaline in the masonry reacted with the original building materials, causing crumbling and erosion to walls of structures (as seen at the House of the Coloured Capitals) and peeling of the original pigments.

After the 1980s, the materials used in reconstruction were replaced by modern alternatives which would not react adversely with the original structures and artworks. The old reconstructions are being gradually replaced. However, the damage has already been done in many places. As a result, mitigative replacement endeavors will take many more years to complete.

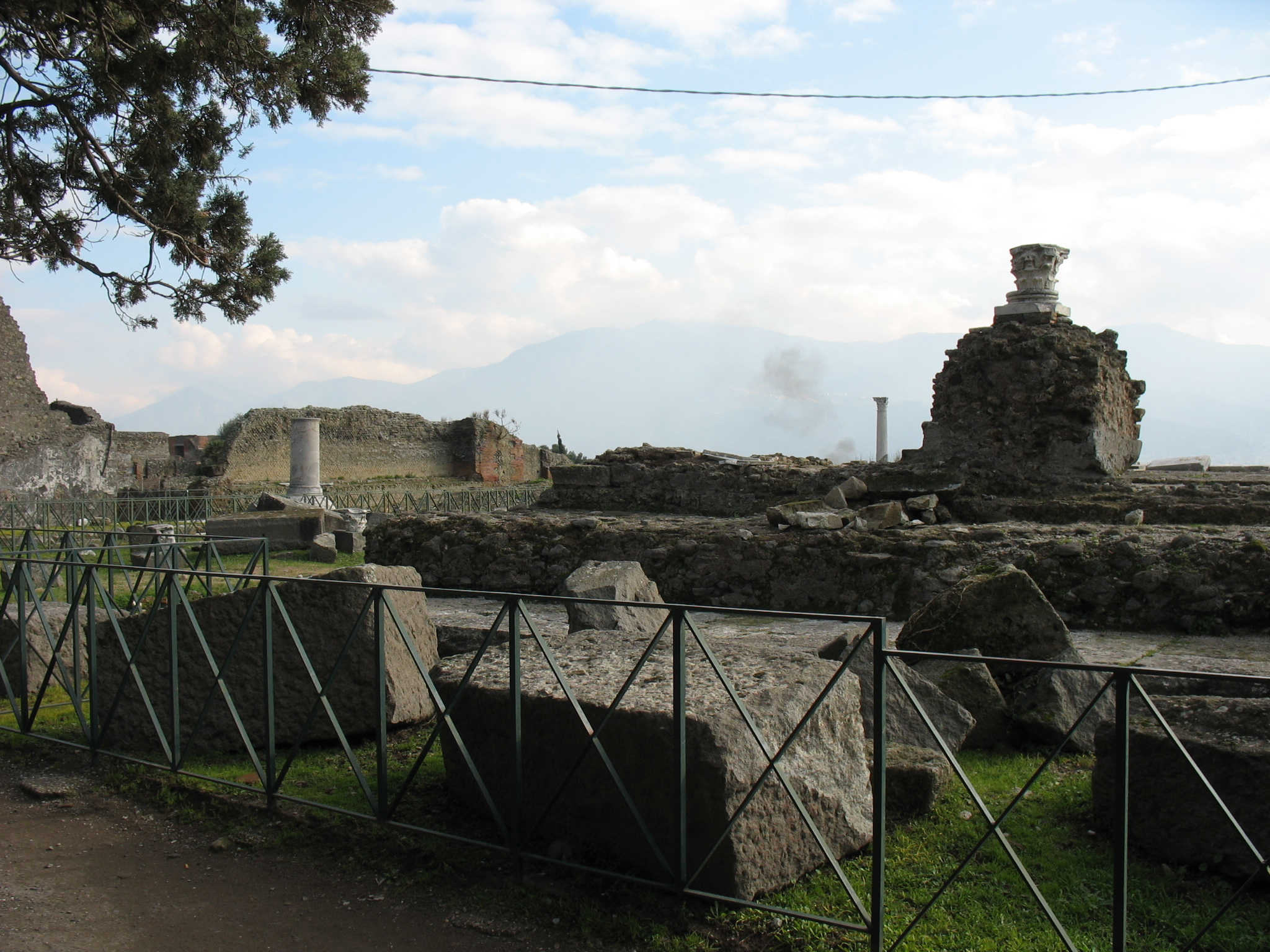
Fencing in the temple of Venus in Pompeii prevents vandalism of the site, as well as theft - many tourists obtain small artifacts from both cities as souvenirs.

==== Tourism ====
Tourism has created positive and negative effects for the site. As there are 2.5 million visitors to both cities every year, their presence allows for education on the site's conservation issues. Additionally, a law was passed in Italy in 1997, which allowed for all money raised from these tourists to help with the site's conservation.

However, the massive number of tourists also causes many problems. The general movement of them causes the gradual wearing down of the roads and pavements, particularly in the more frequented areas like the Pompeiian Forum complex. Tourists also might take chips of rock or stone from the site and accidentally brush against the walls and frescoes, further increasing their rate of deterioration. The open nature of both locations to tourists is also a leading cause of vandalism and theft.

==== Vandalism ====
Vandalism at Herculaneum, 2026

Vandalism, particularly graffiti, is a problematic issue for Pompeii and Herculaneum. Tourists and others often break off parts of the city's structures to take home as mementos or souvenirs. Graffiti appears inscribed in the walls (often alongside their ancient counterparts) as well as on paintings and frescoes, particularly the less damaged or unsullied works of art.

An example of vandalism occurred in June 2024 when a 27-year-old tourist from the Netherlands damaged the stucco wall of an excavated Herculaneum villa with a graffiti signature in black permanent marker. The tourist was reprimanded and charged with damage to and defacement of an artistic work.

==== War ====
During the Allied invasion of Italy in WWII, the site was erroneously struck by over 160 Allied bombs which were intended for nearby infrastructural targets. On the night of 24 August 1943, British RAF bombers intending to attack the rail yard and steelworks in neighboring Torre Annunziata dropped several bombs on the site's southwest corner, resulting in the destruction of the site's antiquarium. The most significant bombing damage occurred between 13 and 20 September 1943, as part of the Allied effort to defend the Salerno beachhead which had been established by the success of Operation Avalanche from an Axis counterattack. Many of the buildings that were damaged or destroyed as a result of bombings were reconstructed in the postwar period, yet the legacy of these military operations has continued to pose threats to the site's preservation. In 1986, a team of archaeologists working on excavating a portion of the city unearthed two bombs which had been dropped during these raids, one of which was unexploded. In 2019, an investigation published by the Italian newspaper Il Fatto Quotidiano estimated that approximately 7 to 10 unexploded bombs may still be lying dormant beneath the sediment and ash in unexcavated portions of the site. While the existence of these bombs poses a threat to future archaeologists, the procedures which military engineers frequently employ to excavate and defuse them are often invasive and have the potential to cause damage to archaeological remains.

==== Theft ====
While both areas have guards, many artifacts still find their way to the illicit antiquities market. These acts of theft often cause accidental damage to surrounding objects, and the thieved antiquities are no longer in situ and lose their context and cultural associations.

In 2003, visitors took two frescoes off a wall in the House of the Chaste Lovers in Pompeii. This act of theft also damaged several other frescoes in the house, and, though a camera system exists in Pompeii, it had been out of operation for several months when the event took place. The two frescoes were recovered some months later, but many others have disappeared from the site, yet to return.

== House of the Gladiators Collapse ==
The 2,000-year-old “House of the Gladiators” in ancient Pompeii’s ruins collapsed on 6 November 2010. Known officially by its Latin name “Schola Armatorum,” the structure was not open to visitors. Still, it was visible from the outside as tourists walked along with one of the ancient city’s main streets. There was no immediate word on what caused the building to collapse, although reports suggested water infiltration following heavy rains might be responsible. There has been fierce controversy regarding the collapse.

== Conservation Projects ==
There are many conservation projects, endeavors and enterprises associated with both cities in an attempt to prevent further deterioration. These focus on removing the forces that attack the sites, as well as restoring the damaged artifacts and preventing further destruction.

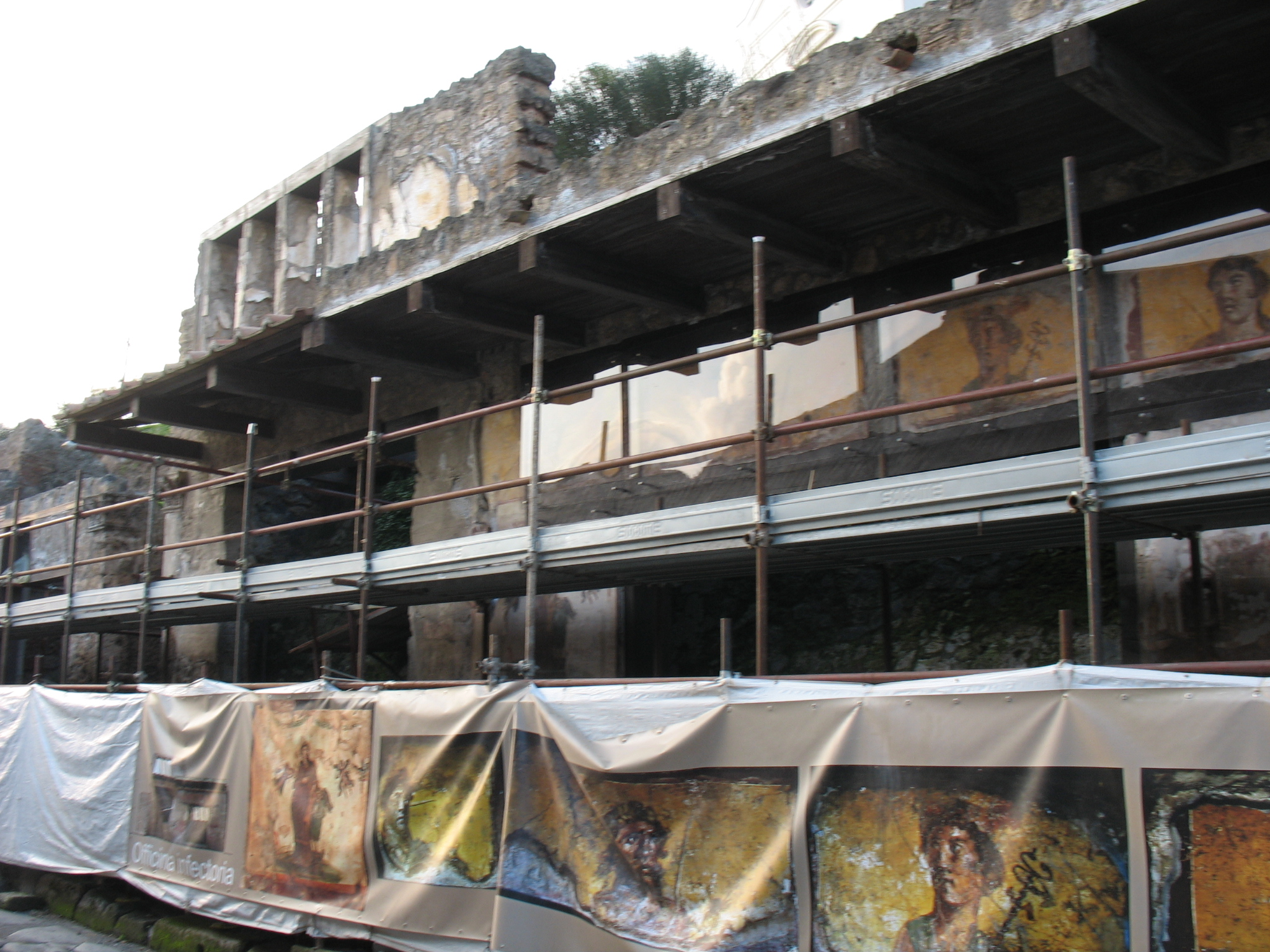
This site of conservation work on the Via dell'Abbondanza (Street of Abundance) is part of a larger project by the Soprintendenza Archaeologica di Pompeii to restore the facades and frescoes of many buildings on the street.

=== Soprintendenza Speciale per i Beni Archeologici di Napoli e Pompei ===
The Soprintendenza Speciale per i Beni Archeologici di Napoli e Pompei is the major administrative body of both sites and others in the Naples and Vesuvian area. It has overall responsibility for caring for both ancient cities, managing the sites, conserving them, removing plants, providing security to prevent further theft, administering tourist entry into the area, and reconstructing various buildings. It also directs many other subsidiary projects and controls all funding and access to the two cities. The institute runs projects such as the restoration of frescoes and sculptures in Pompeii. Additionally, modern technology is used to help in conservation; in 2006, a laser survey was created of the Forum complex, allowing a three-dimensional, digital reconstruction.

=== Moratorium ===
In 1999, Pietro Giovanni Guzzo declared a moratorium on all further excavations of both sites. The superintendent decided all funds should be diverted into preserving the remains of both cities rather than excavating when massive amounts of work are needed on unearthed areas. The decision caused controversy amongst historians and archaeologists, becoming the centre of debate on whether to focus on conservation or excavation. Classicists argue that only by continuing excavations can more ancient texts reveal more about ancient Roman life. In particular, the unexcavated chamber of the Villa of the Papyri, where over 1,800 carbonized papyrus rolls have been discovered containing works of Epicurean philosophy by Philodemus. However, those in favor of conservation argue that texts are safer underground rather than exposed.

The Anglo-American Project currently undertakes minor excavations, such as the House of the Surgeon at Pompeii (at the cost of 10 million euro a year), which are still allowed. However, no new sites are open to be excavated.

=== Herculaneum Conservation Project ===
As a joint project led by the Packard Humanities Institute and the Soprintendenza Speciale per I Beni Archaeologici di Napoli e Pompeii with the British School Rome, the project has worked since 2001 to halt the serious decay conditions which were found at the site. Initially, the work focused on an emergency campaign that then transformed into works to ensure the site's long-term maintenance. A major emphasis has been placed on ensuring that infrastructures work effectively. When the project is complete, the Soprintendenza will be better positioned to manage the site's continuous care. In addition scientific research is underway so that suitable methodologies can be identified to conserve Herculaneum's wall paintings, plasters, mosaics, wooden features, structures, etc.

== Other sources ==
- Thompson, Jane (2007). "Conservation and Management Challenges in a Public/Private partnership for a Large Archaeological Site (Herculaneum, Italy)". Conservation and Management of Archaeological Sites. 8 (4): 191–204. doi:10.1179/175355208X320838. S2CID 108439391.
- Allison, Penelope (2004). Pompeian Households: An Analysis of the Material Culture. Cotsen Institute of Archaeology. ISBN 0-917956-96-6. Archived from the original on 2007-02-11.
- Hurley, Toni; et al. (2005). Antiquity 3. Oxford University Press. ISBN 0-19-551687-7. Archived from the original on 2006-09-17.
- Zarmati, Louise (2005). Heinemann ancient and medieval history: Pompeii and Herculaneum. Heinemann. ISBN 1-74081-195-X. Archived from the original on 2006-09-04.
